= Jurong Hill =

Hill in western Singapore

Coordinates: 1°19′03.39″N 103°42′28.90″E

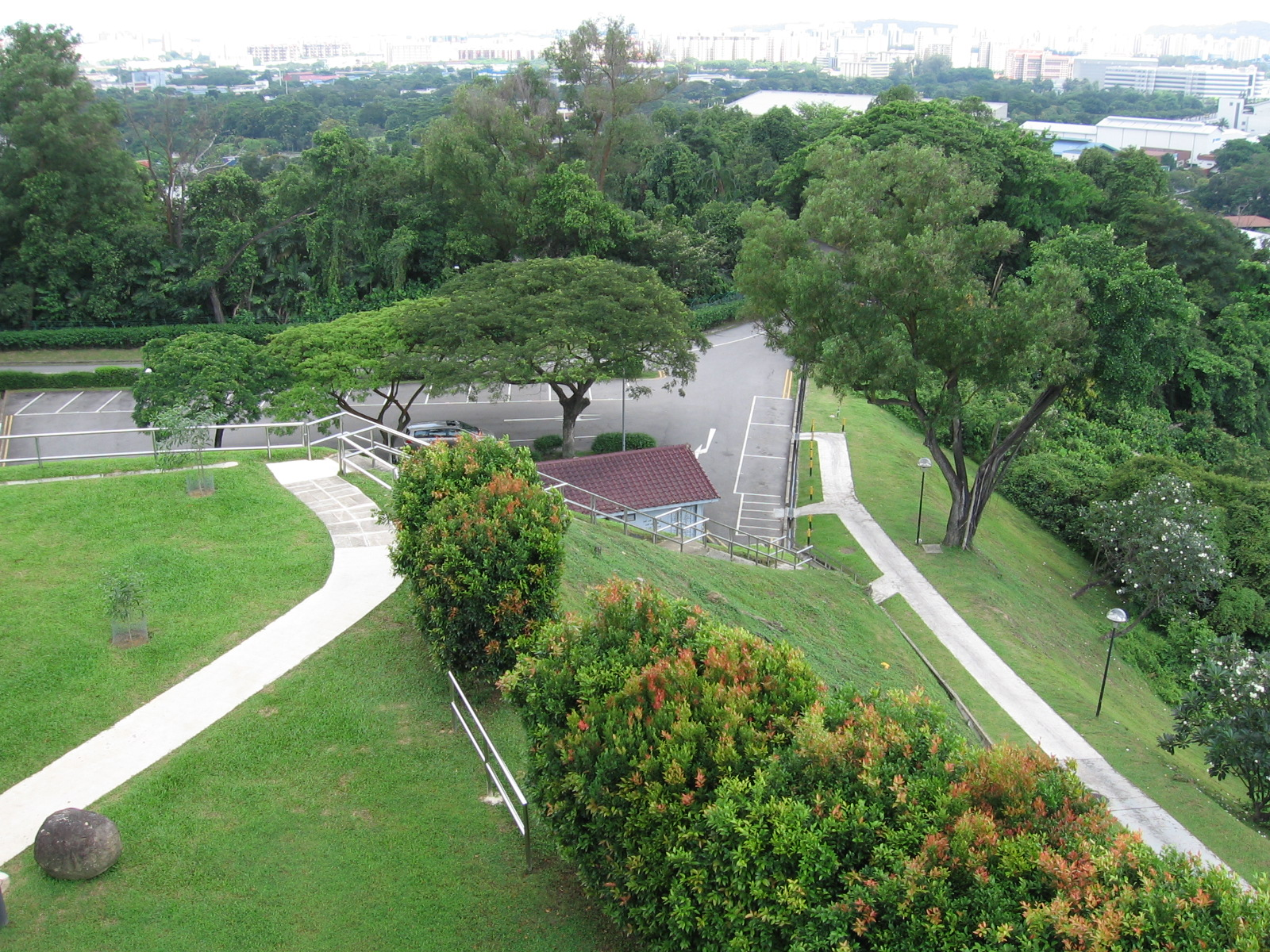
- Jurong Hill

Highest point
- Elevation: 60 m (197 ft)

Naming
- Native name: Bukit Peropok (Malay)

Geography
- Location within Singapore
- Location: Jurong, Singapore
- Parent range: 15 hectares

Geology
- Mountain type: hill

Jurong Hill (Chinese: 裕廊山; Malay: Bukit Peropok) is a scenic hill situated in western Singapore off Jalan Ahmad Ibrahim. It is enveloped in 15 hectares of lush greenery and stands at 60 meters. As of 5 October 2023, Jurong Hill has been closed for construction works.

== History ==
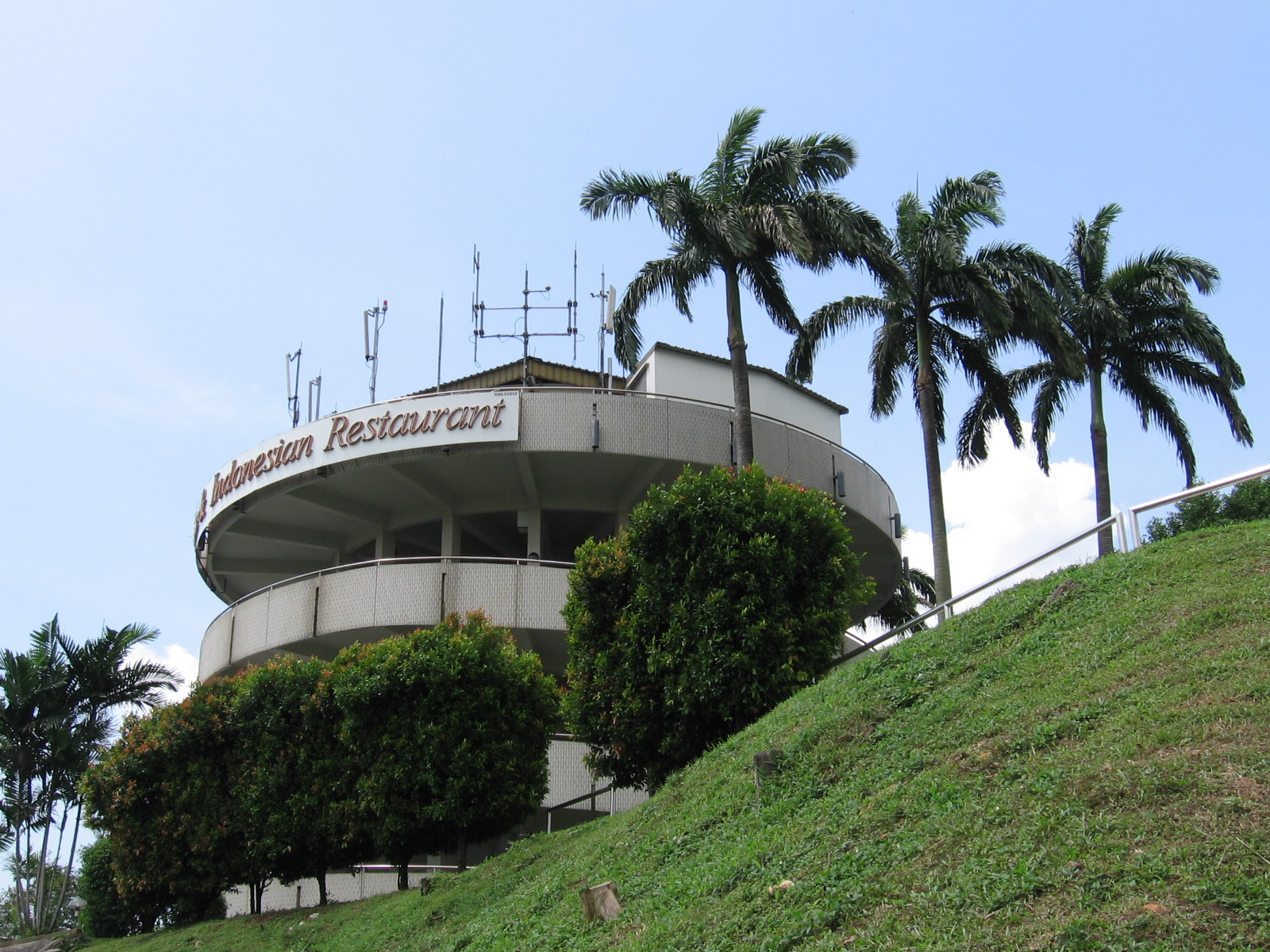
Look-out tower on Jurong Hill.

Since 1971, the hill has been a landmark in the Jurong region. A look-out tower stands on Jurong Hill, where one can get an aerial view of Town. The hill's adjacent park, Jurong Hill Park, was constructed by JTC Corporation. Within the park is a "garden of fame", so named for the many trees planted by visiting foreign dignitaries. Jurong Bird Park was located on the western slope of Jurong Hill.

It is bounded by Jalan Ahmad Ibrahim, Pioneer Road, Jalan Buroh and Jurong Pier Road.

The Hilltop Japanese and Indonesian Restaurant was a long-standing restaurant located on the hill. It was closed in 2014.

== Garden of fame ==
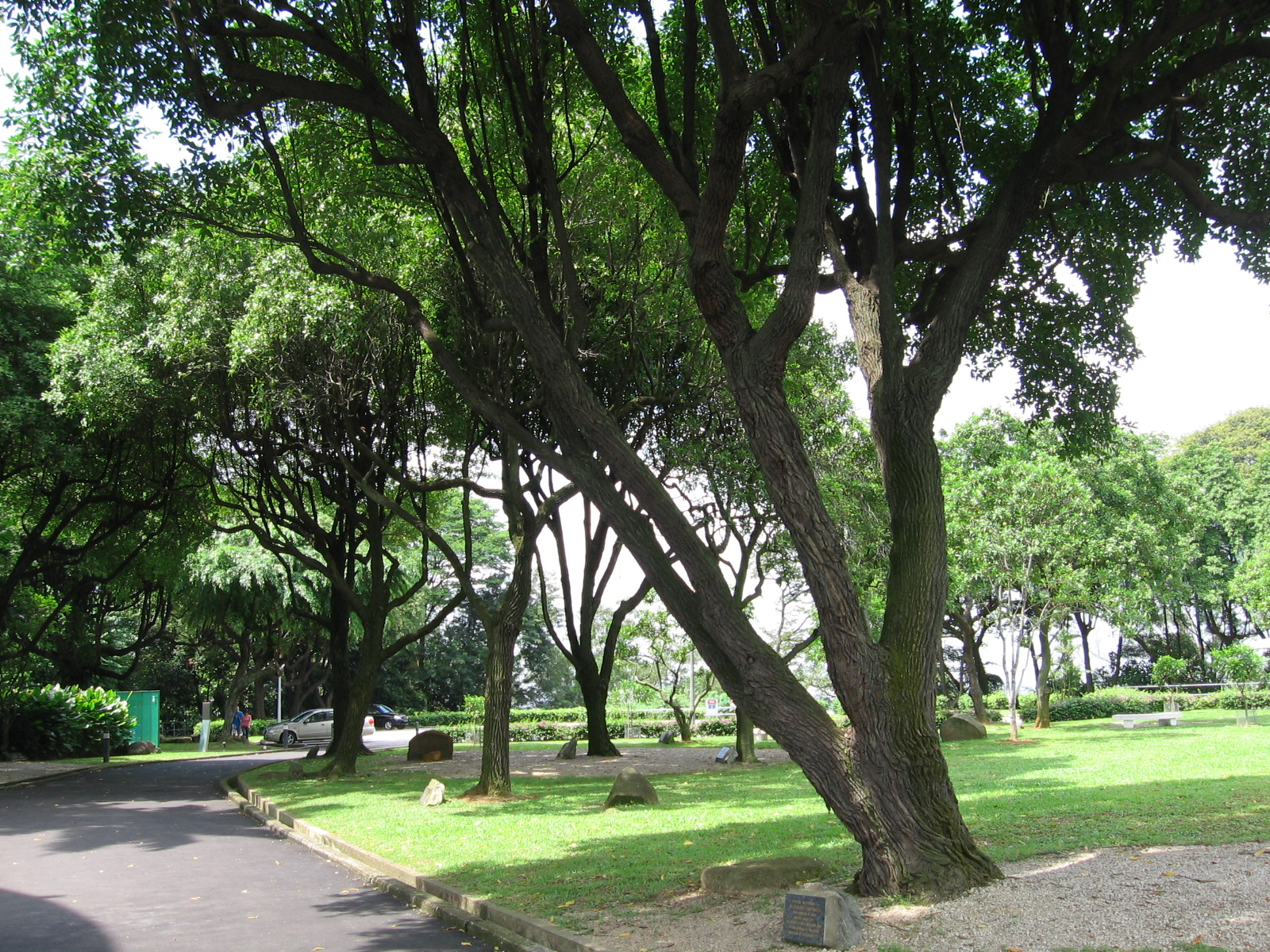
Jurong Hill, Singapore.

The following celebrities planted trees in the garden:

- Princess Alexandra, The Honourable Lady Ogilvy of the United Kingdom - She planted the first tree in the garden in 1969 while attending the 150th Anniversary of the Founding of Singapore and the National Day Celebration.
- Pierre Elliott Trudeau - Prime Minister of Canada (23 May 1970)
- Soeharto - President of The Republic of Indonesia (29 to 31 August 1974)
- Ferdinand E. Marcos - President of the Republic of The Philippines (27 to 29 January 1976)
- Mom Rajwongse Kukrit Pramoj - Prime Minister of Thailand (24 to 27 July 1975)
- Dr Albert Winsemius - Economic advisor from 1961 to 1984 to Singapore (1 March 1984)
- The Duke of Edinburgh (19 February 1972)
- Queen Elizabeth II of the United Kingdom (18 February to 20 February 1972)
- Mohammad Reza Pahlavi - Imperial Majesty of Iran (18 to 20 September 1974)
- Takeo Fukuda - Prime Minister of Japan (14 to 15 August 1977)
- Deng Xiaoping - Vice Premier of The People's Republic of China (12 to 14 November 1978)
- Shri Varahagiri Venkata Giri - President of India (14 to 17 September 1971)
- Gaston Thorn - Prime Minister of Luxembourg (13 to 14 June 1978)
- Major General Ziaur Rahman BU, PSC - President of People's Republic of Bangladesh (20 to 21 September 1978)
- Hans Koschnick - Prime Minister of the state of Bremen, Federal Republic of Germany (29 January 1971)
- Spiro Agnew - Vice President of The United States of America (10 January 1970)
- Errol Walton Barrow - Prime Minister of Barbados (23 January 1971)
- Lord Mayor Peter Schulz - The President of the Senate of The Free and Hanseatic City of Hamburg (19 February 1973)
- Sirimavo Bandaranaike - The Prime Minister of Ceylon (11 January 1971)
- Dr. Kofi Abrefa Busia - Prime Minister of Ghana (23 January 1971)
- Prince Bertil, Duke of Halland (30 September 1975)
- Crown Prince Harald of Norway - Crown Prince Harald of Norway (23 February 1978)
- Prince Richard, Duke of Gloucester GCVO (1 November 1975)
- Michael Thomas Somare, CH - Prime Minister of Papua New Guinea (23 to 29 July 1978)
- William McMahon - Prime Minister of Australia (9 June 1972)
- Princess Margaret, Countess of Snowdon - United Kingdom (17 to 19 October 1972)
- Džemal Bijedić - President of the Federal Executive Council of Yugoslavia (19 March 1973)

== Gallery ==
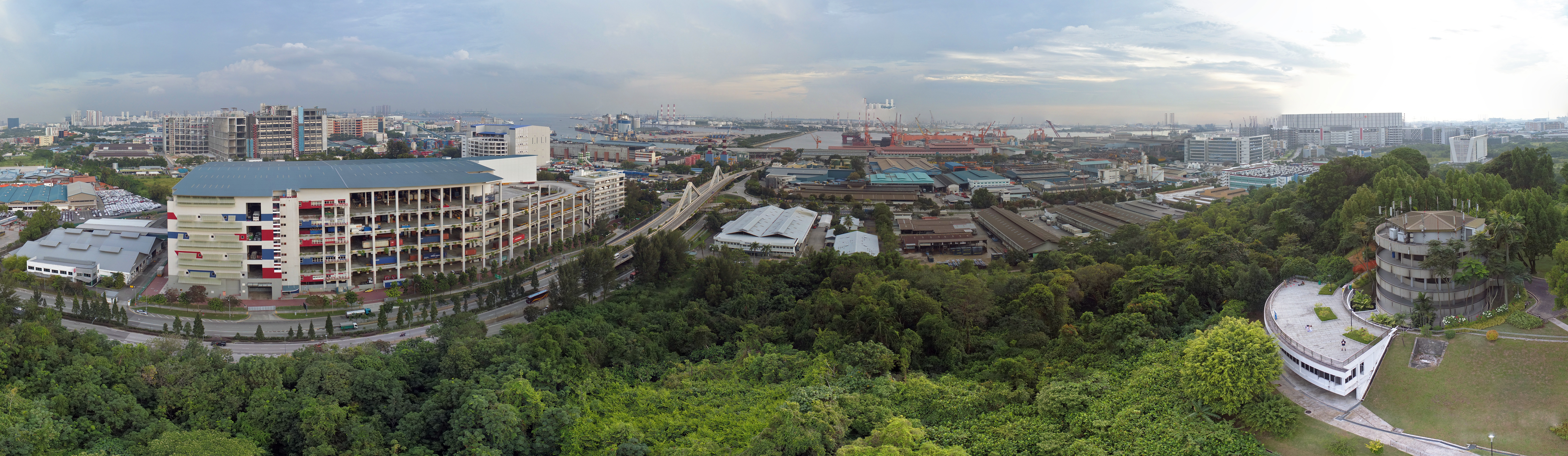
Jurong Hill aerial panorama facing Jurong island

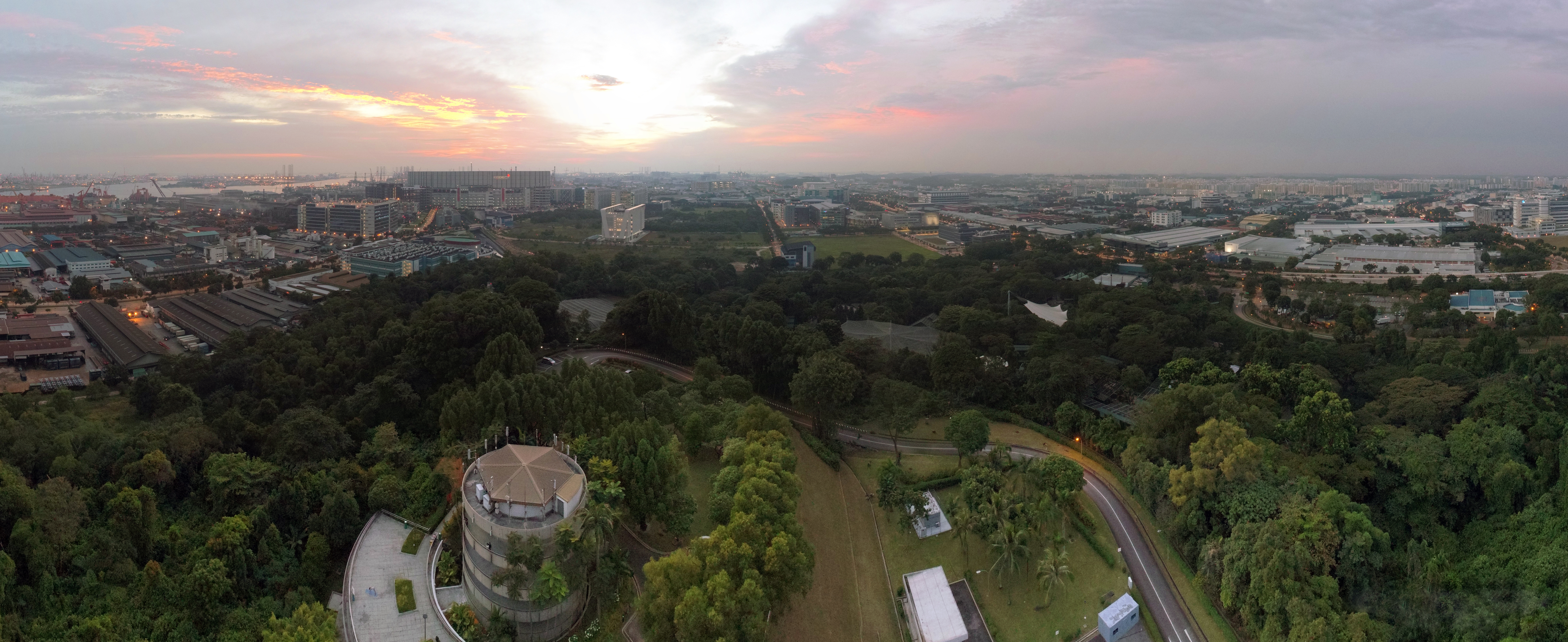
Jurong Hill sunset
