= Jurong Bird Park =

Former zoo in Jurong, Singapore

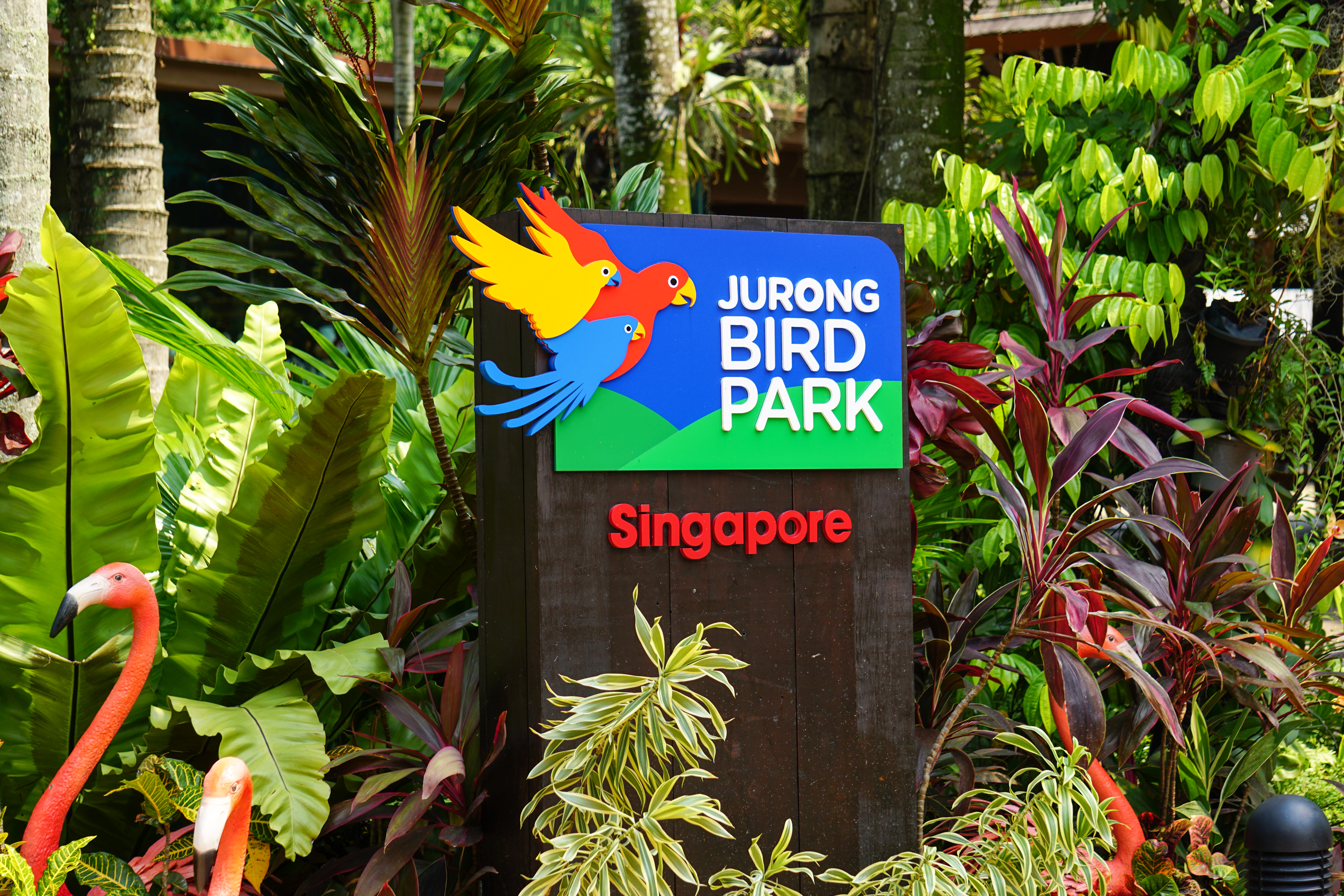
- Entrance in 2014
- Interactive map of Jurong Bird Park
- 1°19′05″N 103°42′26″E
- Date opened: 3 January 1971; 55 years ago
- Date closed: 3 January 2023; 3 years ago (succeeded by Bird Paradise)
- Location: Jurong, Singapore; 2 Jurong Hill, Singapore 628925
- Land area: 20.2 ha (50 acres)
- No. of animals: 5000
- No. of species: 400
- Annual visitors: 768,933 (FY 2019/20)
- Owner: Mandai Wildlife Reserve
- Public transit: 194

Jurong Bird Park was an aviary in Jurong in the western part of Singapore. Opened in 1971, it was the largest bird park in Asia during its operations, covering an area of 0.2 square kilometres (49 acres) on the western slope of Jurong Hill. It was one of the parks managed by Mandai Wildlife Reserve, which also manages the Singapore Zoo, Night Safari and River Wonders.

In 2016, the group announced that the Jurong Bird Park would be relocated to a much larger park at Mandai Lake Road by 2020, consolidating with the three existing wildlife parks together with a new Rainforest Park to form an integrated nature and wildlife precinct known as the Mandai Wildlife Reserve. In 2021, the group announced that the park's successor in Mandai would be named Bird Paradise. In 2022, it was announced that Jurong Bird Park would close on 3 January 2023 to finalise its move to Bird Paradise at Mandai, which opened on 8 May that year.

== History ==
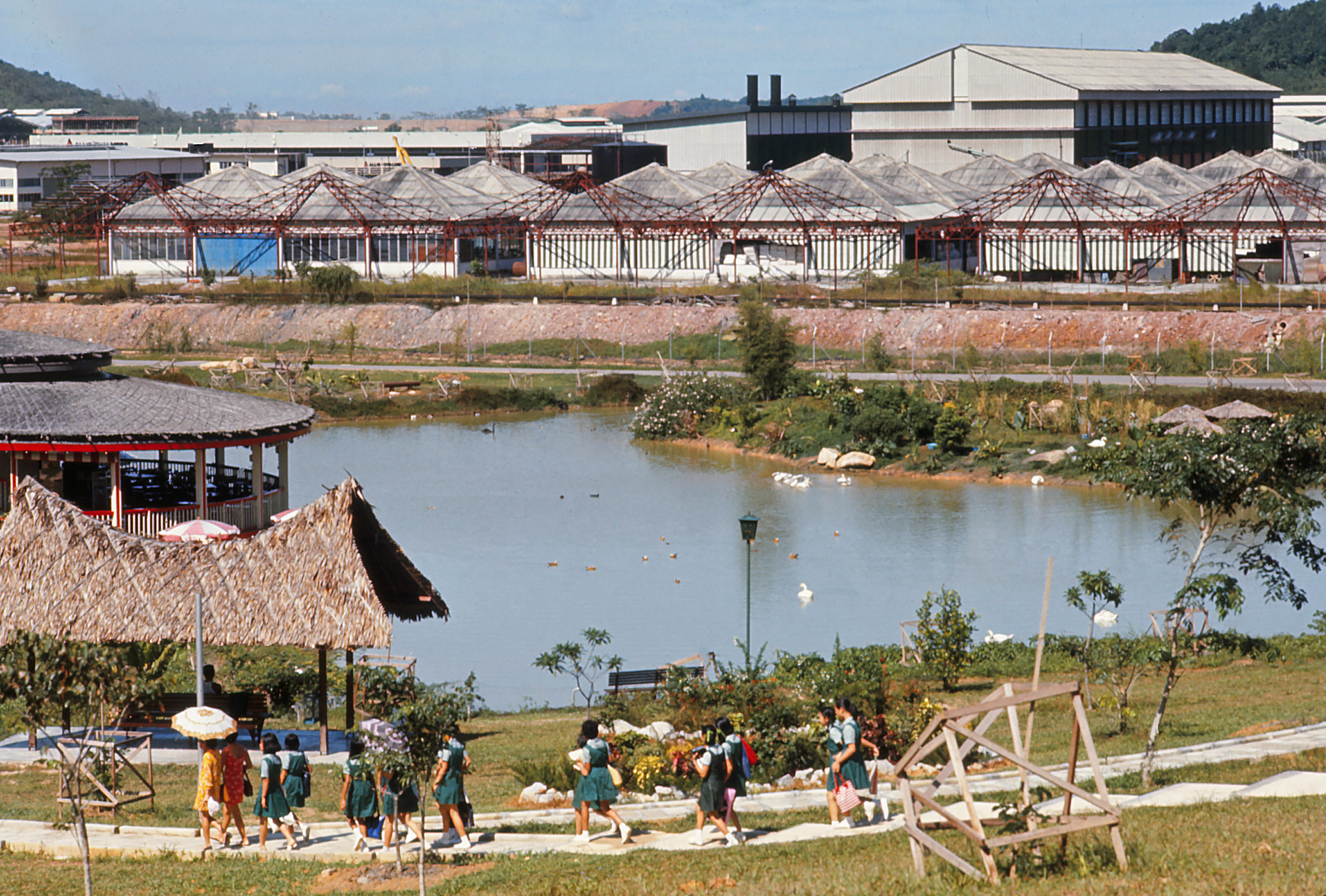
Jurong Bird Park shortly after its opening in 1971

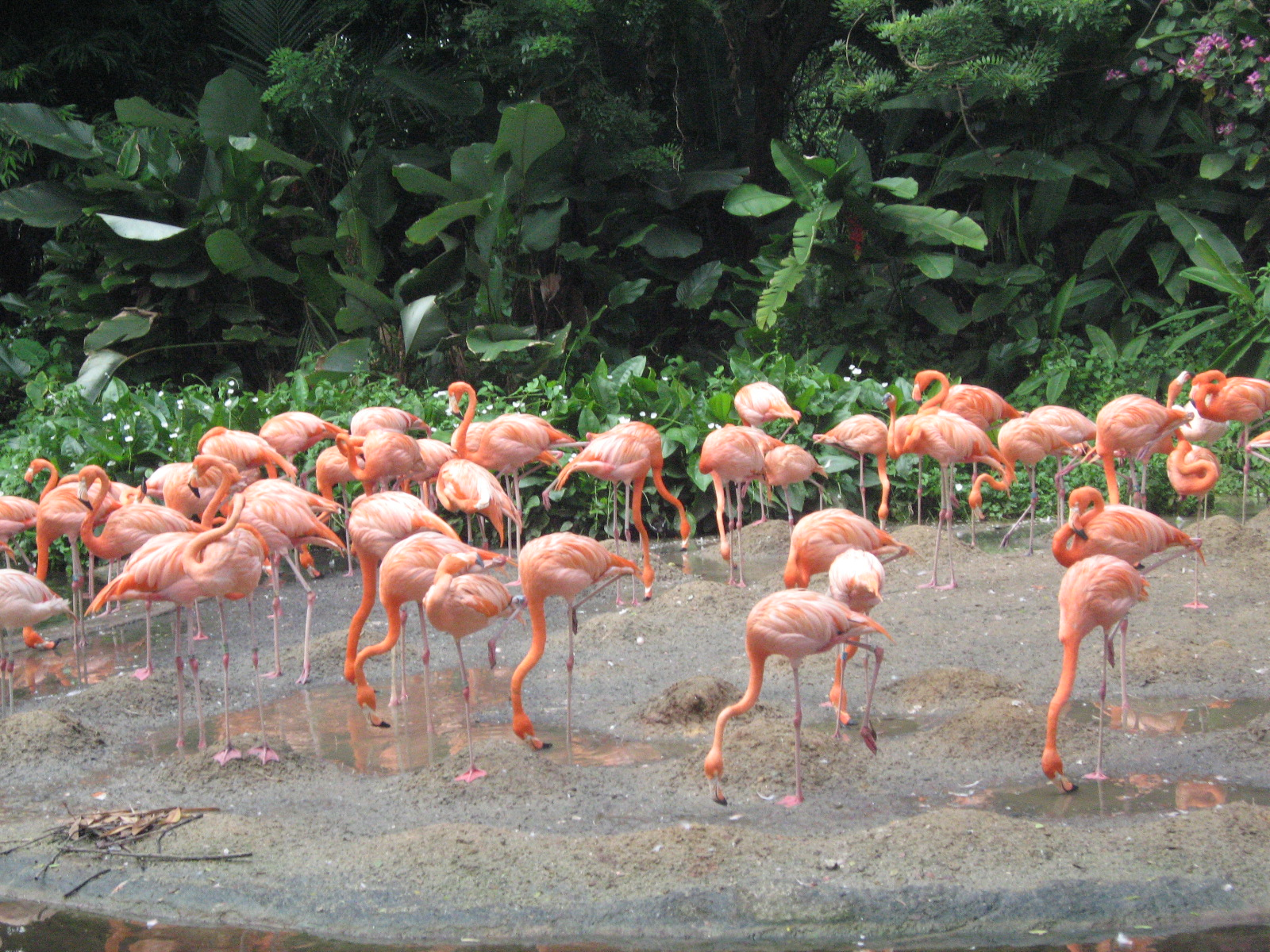
American flamingo at Jurong Bird Park

The idea of a permanent aviary was first conceived by Goh Keng Swee, then Minister for Finance, in 1968. During a World Bank meeting in Rio de Janeiro, Goh visited its zoological garden and was impressed with its free-flight aviary. He set out to ensure that Singaporeans would have a place where they could escape from urban life and relax with nature.

Work on the aviary started in January 1969. A 14-hectare (35-acre) site on the western slope of Bukit Peropok in Jurong was chosen for the project. The bird park was expected to be completed by the end of 1969.

On 3 January 1971, Jurong Bird Park, built at a cost of S$3.5 million, was opened to the public.

Jurong Bird Park became a world-famous bird zoo holding specimens of exotic bird life from around the world, including a large flock of flamingos. At the time of its closing in 2023 it was the world's largest bird park in terms of the number of birds, and second largest both in the number of bird species and land area (after Germany's Walsrode World Bird Park). There are 5,000 birds of 400 species in Jurong Bird Park, of which 24% are of threatened species, the highest percentage in any zoo worldwide.

In 2006, Jurong Bird Park completed a S$10 million makeover. As a result of the upgrade, the park got a new entrance plaza, a park-owned and managed Bongo Burgers restaurant, an ice cream parlour, a gift shop and a bird hospital.

Potential uses for the Jurong site after the bird park's closure include residential or recreational space. Memorable features such as the waterfall are expected to be retained.

== Animals and exhibits ==
Penguin Coast

The Penguin Coast opened on 1 December 2010 as an upgrade of the outdated Penguin Parade habitat. African penguins were able to live in an outdoor pool meant to recreate a South African coastline with artificially created waves on the lagoon. Inside a Portuguese galleon facade, gentoo penguins, Humboldt penguins, king penguins and northern rockhopper penguins were kept in a climate-controlled enclosure kept at 10–15 °C (50–59 °F).

Flamingo Pool

Caribbean flamingos and lesser flamingos lived in two enclosures that opened in 1984.

Flamingo Lake

The park boasted a large flock of greater flamingos that had been breeding successfully since 1972.

Wings of Asia

500 birds from 135 species were housed in this aviary. The aviary housed and had successfully bred many endangered birds, such as the Bali myna, black-winged starling, Edwards's pheasant, Malayan peacock-pheasant, Mindanao bleeding-heart, Santa Cruz ground dove and straw-headed bulbul.

Heliconia Walk

The Jurong Bird Park had the largest collection of Heliconias in Southeast Asia with over 167 species. Many different aviaries housed a variety of rare and endangered birds.

Wetlands

Guests could observe a variety of waterbirds including black-bellied whistling ducks, black-faced spoonbills, boat-billed herons, cattle egrets, Eurasian spoonbills, hamerkops, Meller's ducks, roseate spoonbills, straw-necked ibises and white-faced whistling ducks. The park received a breeding pair of shoebills from Qatar in 2018. A wave machine prevented the build-up of algae in the water.

Royal Ramble

A series of three walkthrough aviaries with Victoria crowned pigeons and a variety of other birds.

Window on Paradise

This building had three free-flight aviaries for rare birds-of-paradise.

Hornbills and Toucans

The area consisted of 27 large aviaries containing the world's largest collection of hornbills. The Jurong Bird Park was the first to successfully breed the black hornbill in captivity. Species housed in this area are black hornbills, great hornbills, Northern African grey hornbills, oriental pied hornbills, Papuan hornbills, red-billed toucans, rhinoceros hornbills, silvery-cheeked hornbills, southern ground hornbills, southern rufous hornbills, toco toucans, trumpeter hornbills, Von der Decken's hornbills, western long-tailed hornbills, white-crowned hornbills, wreathed hornbills and wrinkled hornbills

African Treetops

This walkthrough aviary simulated the canopy layer of a rainforest and features various birds from the rainforests of Africa. It featured elevated walkways and a suspension bridge to provide an immersive experience, including ashy starlings, greater blue-eared starlings, great blue turacos, golden-breasted starlings, long-tailed glossy starlings, purple glossy starlings, red-crested turacos, red-winged starlings, superb starlings, violet-backed starlings and Von der Decken's hornbills. The African Treetops aviary was formerly the Lory Loft, which was moved to the former Jungle Jewels site.

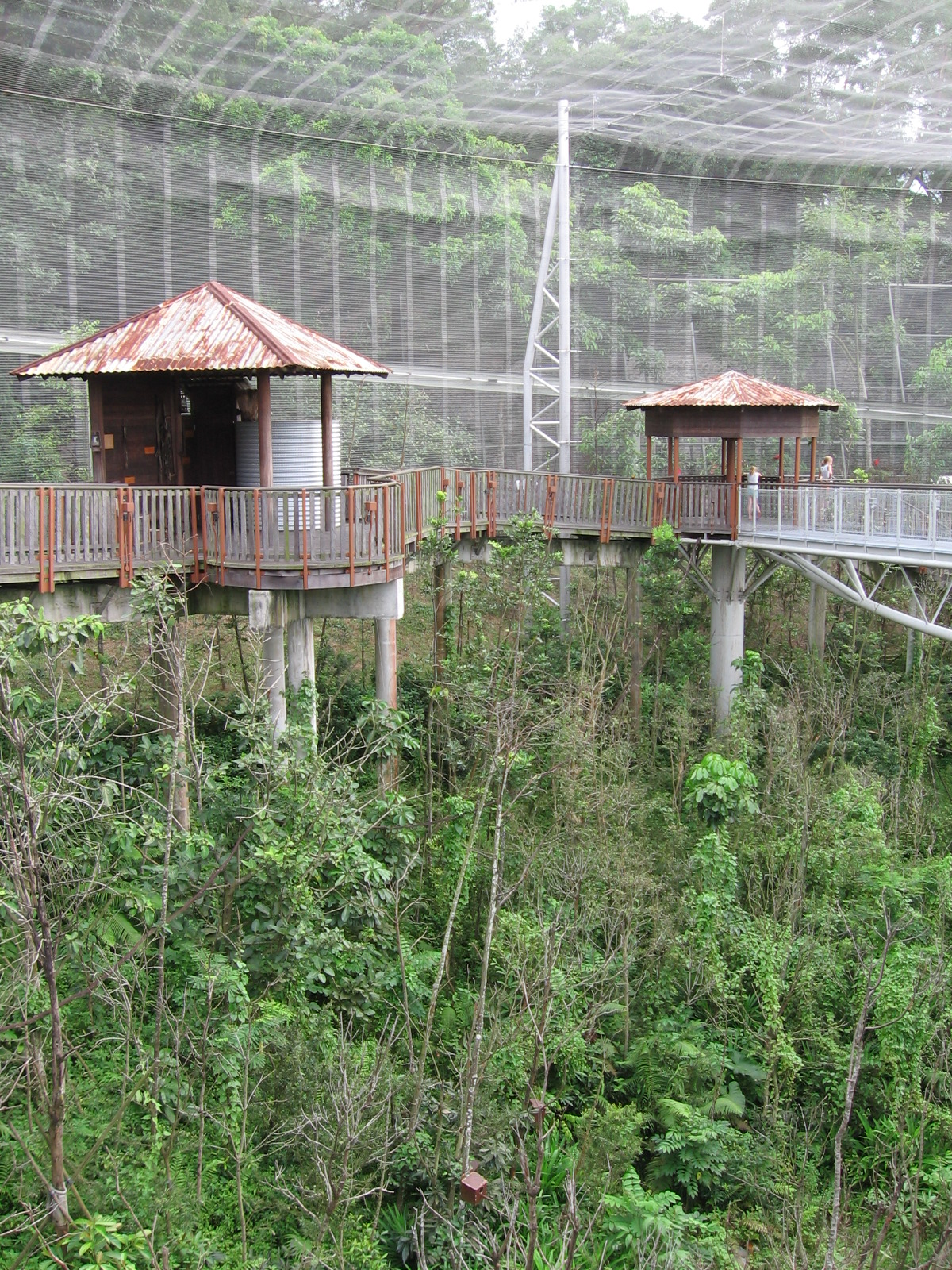
The former Lory Loft aviary, then the African Treetops aviary

Lory Loft

Guests could feed up to 10 species of lorikeets and lories, including black-capped lories, blue-streaked lories, chattering lories, coconut lorikeets, marigold lorikeets, rainbow lorikeets, red lories, red-collared lorikeets, scarlet-breasted lorikeets and yellow-bibbed lories alongside Australian king parrots, blue-faced honeyeaters, blue-winged kookaburras, palm cockatoos and Pesquet's parrots. The attraction was chosen as a "Top 10 Best Family Experience" by the Singapore Tourism Board.

Birds of Prey

A series of large aviaries that housed different species of birds of prey including African white-backed vultures, a palm nut vulture and marabou storks. On 27 November 2019, a pair of critically endangered Philippine eagles named Geothermica and Sambisig were sent to the park as part of a recovery programme.

Dinosaur Descendants

Larger ground-dwelling birds such as cassowaries, saddle-billed storks and a sarus crane were housed in this area. Around the enclosures were four huts containing interactive displays like elephant bird egg replicas and a cassowary's casque as well as a dig site play area for children where they could excavate dinosaur fossils.

Pelican Cove

The park housed multiple species of pelicans: Australian pelicans, Dalmatian pelicans, great white pelicans, pink-backed pelicans and spot-billed pelicans; having housed all pelican species in the past. It was also the world's first pelican underwater viewing gallery.

Parrot Paradise

Located at the far north of the park, this 1-hectare (2.5-acre) complex had cages containing several species of parrots from Australia, Asia and South America, including blue-eyed cockatoos, blue-headed parrots, blue-throated macaws, blue-winged macaws, burrowing parrots, dusky parrots, galahs, golden conures, green-cheeked amazons, grey parrots, hyacinth macaws, red-bellied macaws, red-and-green macaws, red-fronted macaws, red-tailed black cockatoos, salmon-crested cockatoos, scarlet macaws, sun parakeets and yellow-shouldered amazons.

Waterfall Aviary

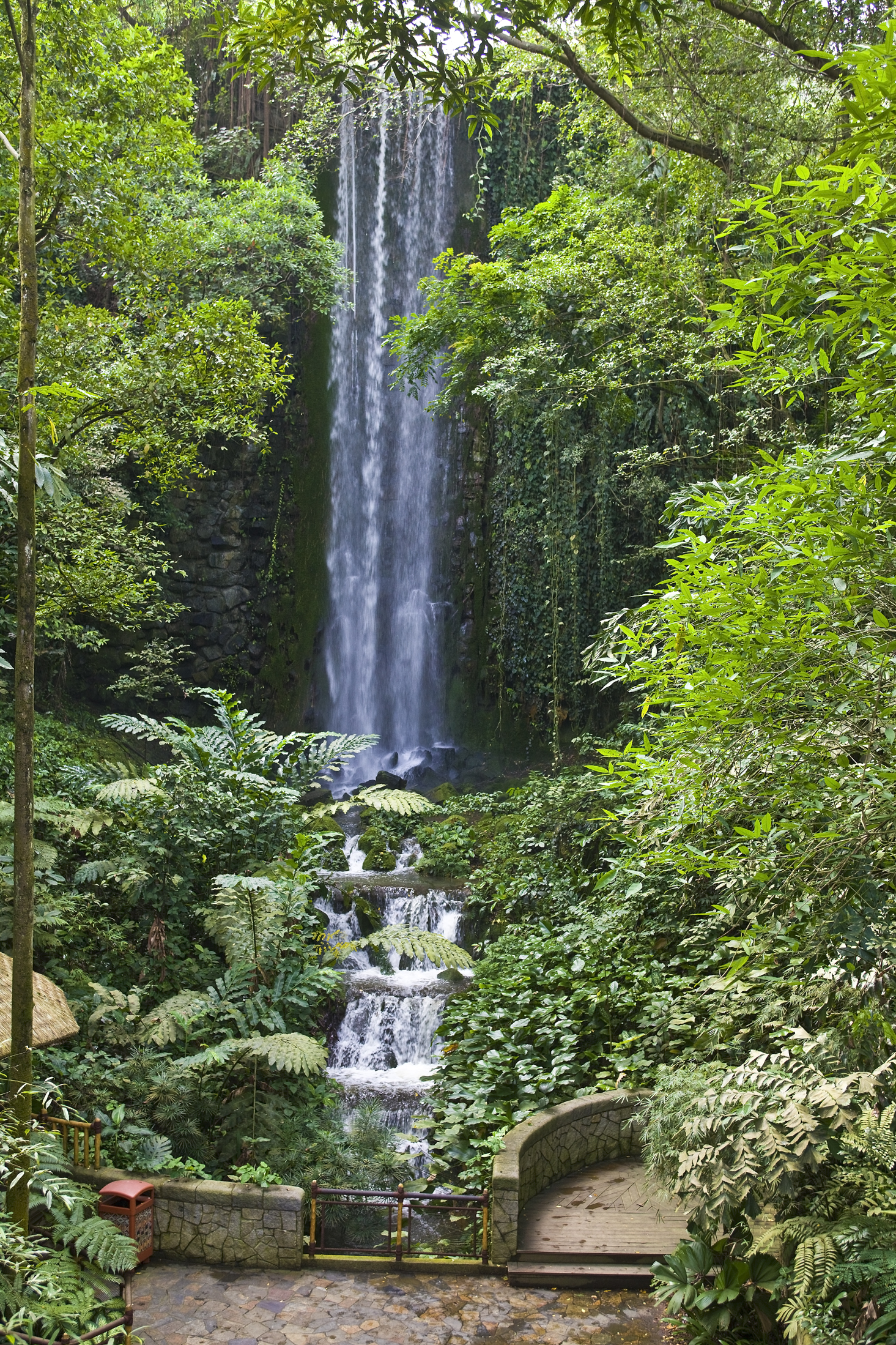
The waterfall in the Waterfall Aviary was once the tallest artificial waterfall at 35 metres (115 ft) tall

The Waterfall Aviary was 2 hectares (4.9 acres) in area and 35 metres (115 ft) tall, and had one of the world's tallest artificial waterfalls. At the time of its construction in the early 1970s the Waterfall Aviary was the world's largest aviary with the world's tallest aviary. Guests crossed a suspended bridge to watch the many different birds. It housed a large variety of birds among which include black crowned cranes, golden-breasted starlings, helmeted guineafowl, milky storks, Nicobar pigeons, pied imperial pigeons, purple glossy starlings, roseate spoonbills, scarlet macaws and superb starlings.

== Shows ==
The "High Flyers Show" showcased the natural abilities and skills of various different birds including their yellow-naped amazon named Amigo who could sing in three different languages. At the end of the show, visitors were allowed to take pictures with a flock of pelicans and flamingos.

The "Kings of the Skies Show" featured the park's birds of prey.

== Awards ==
Awarded to Jurong Bird Park:

- Michelin 2-star rating, 2008
- Conservation & Research Award, International Symposium on Breeding Birds in Captivity, 2006 and 2007
- Excellence Award, Association of Southeast Asian Nations Tourism Association, 2004 and 2007
- Best Loved Pro-Family Business, Singapore, 2006
- Superstar Winner of the Excellent Service Awards, Singapore Tourism Board, 2004
- Tourism Host of the Year, Singapore Tourism Board, 2003
- Breeders Award, American Pheasant and Waterfowl Society, 2001
- Highly Commended, Tourism For Tomorrow International Awards, 1993
- First Breeders Award by the American Pheasant & Waterfowl Society, 2001

== Transportation ==
Throughout its existence, Jurong Bird Park was never directly served by any MRT line, with the nearest station being Boon Lay MRT station.

There is a bus service operated by SBS Transit which calls at the bus stop outside the former park.

The park itself was once served by the Jurong Bird Park Panorail, a 1.7-kilometre (1.1 mi) loop monorail system which ran within the park. The system was constructed by Vonroll Transport Systems of Switzerland, which also built the Sentosa Monorail and Singapore Cable Car. The monorail system used four fully air-conditioned four-car trains which travelled around the park in approximately 11 minutes. It ceased operations in 2012 and was replaced by a trackless tram service similar to the ones found at the Singapore Zoo and Night Safari until the park's closure in 2023.

== Gallery ==
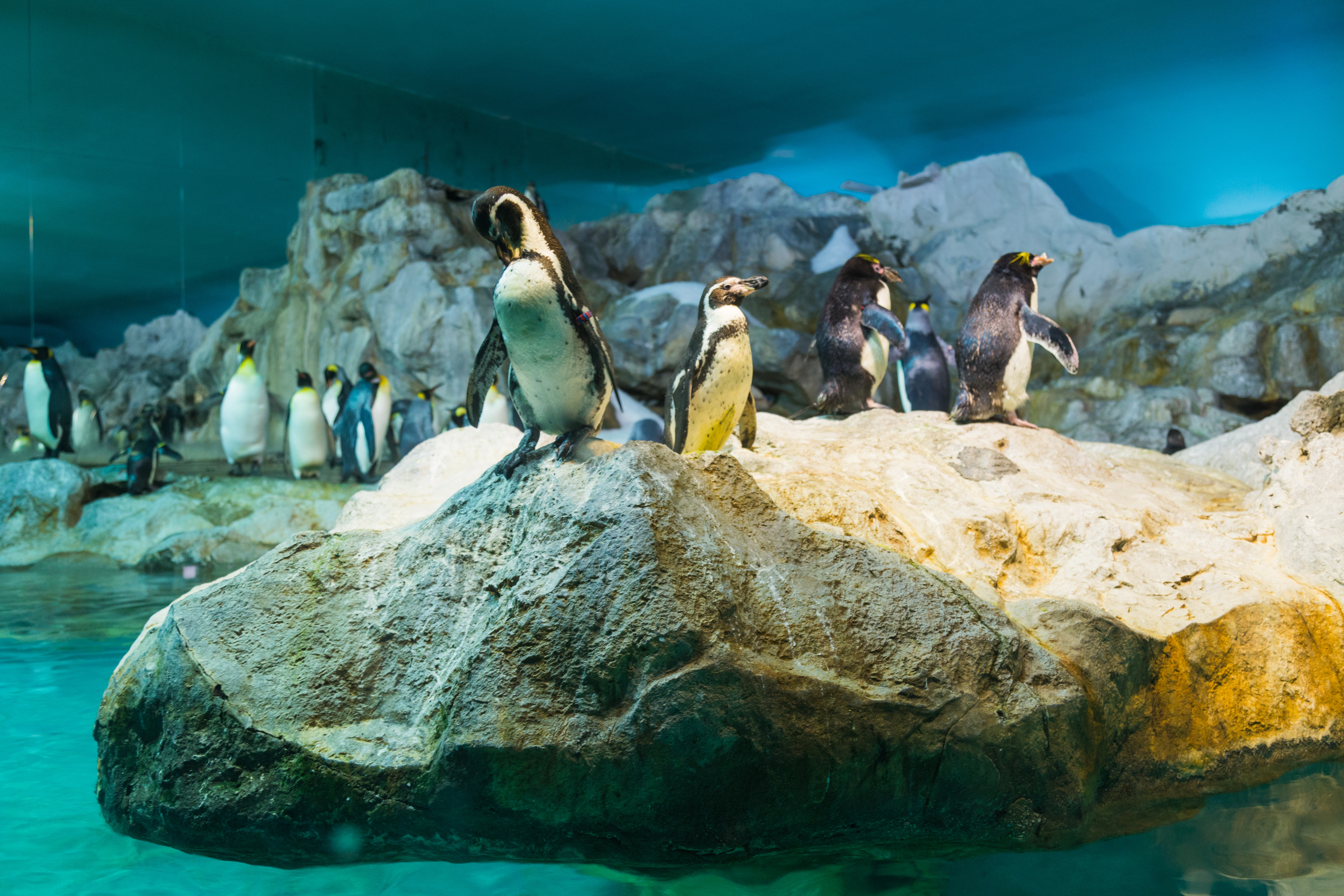
Penguins

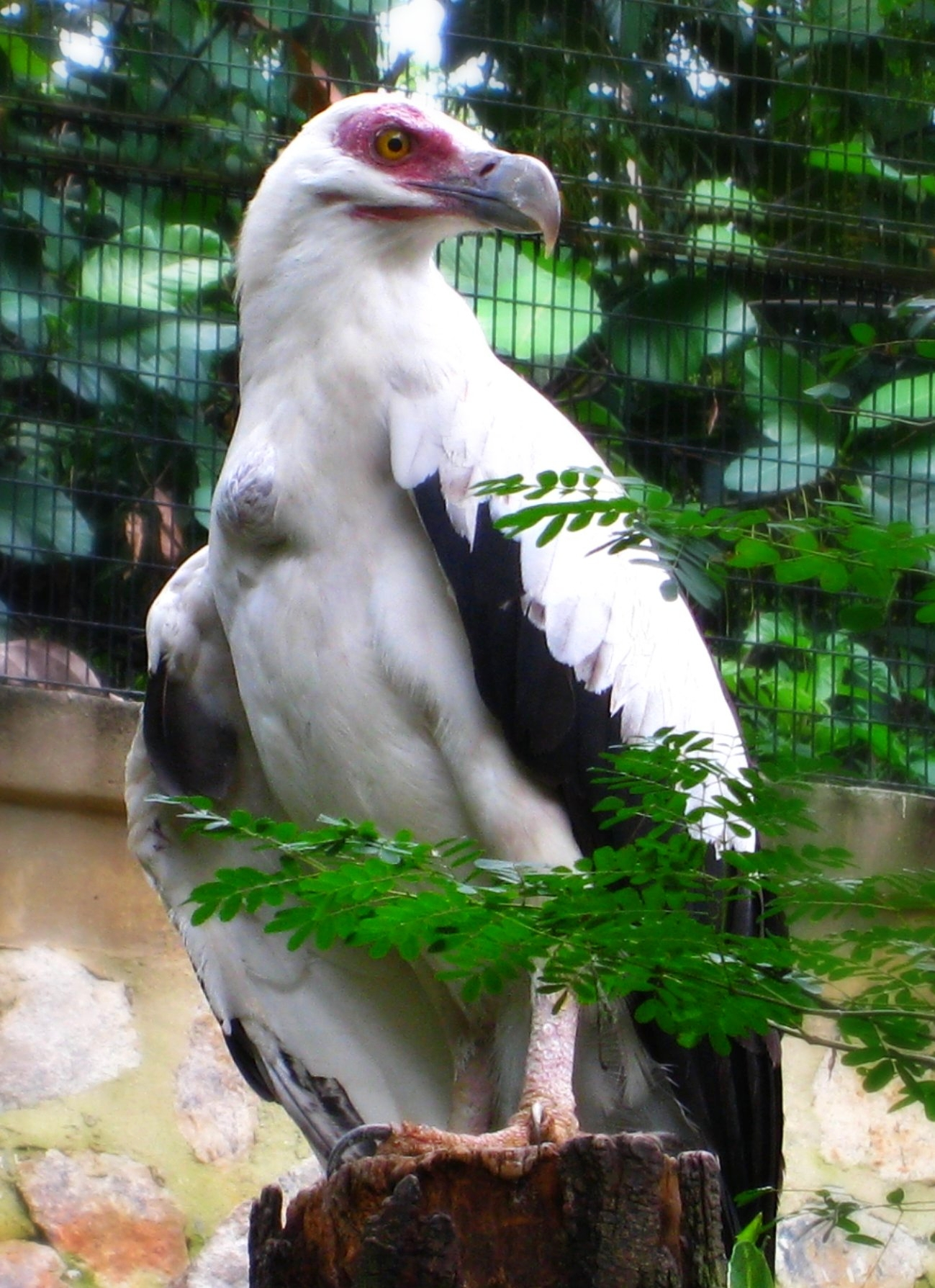
Palm-nut vulture

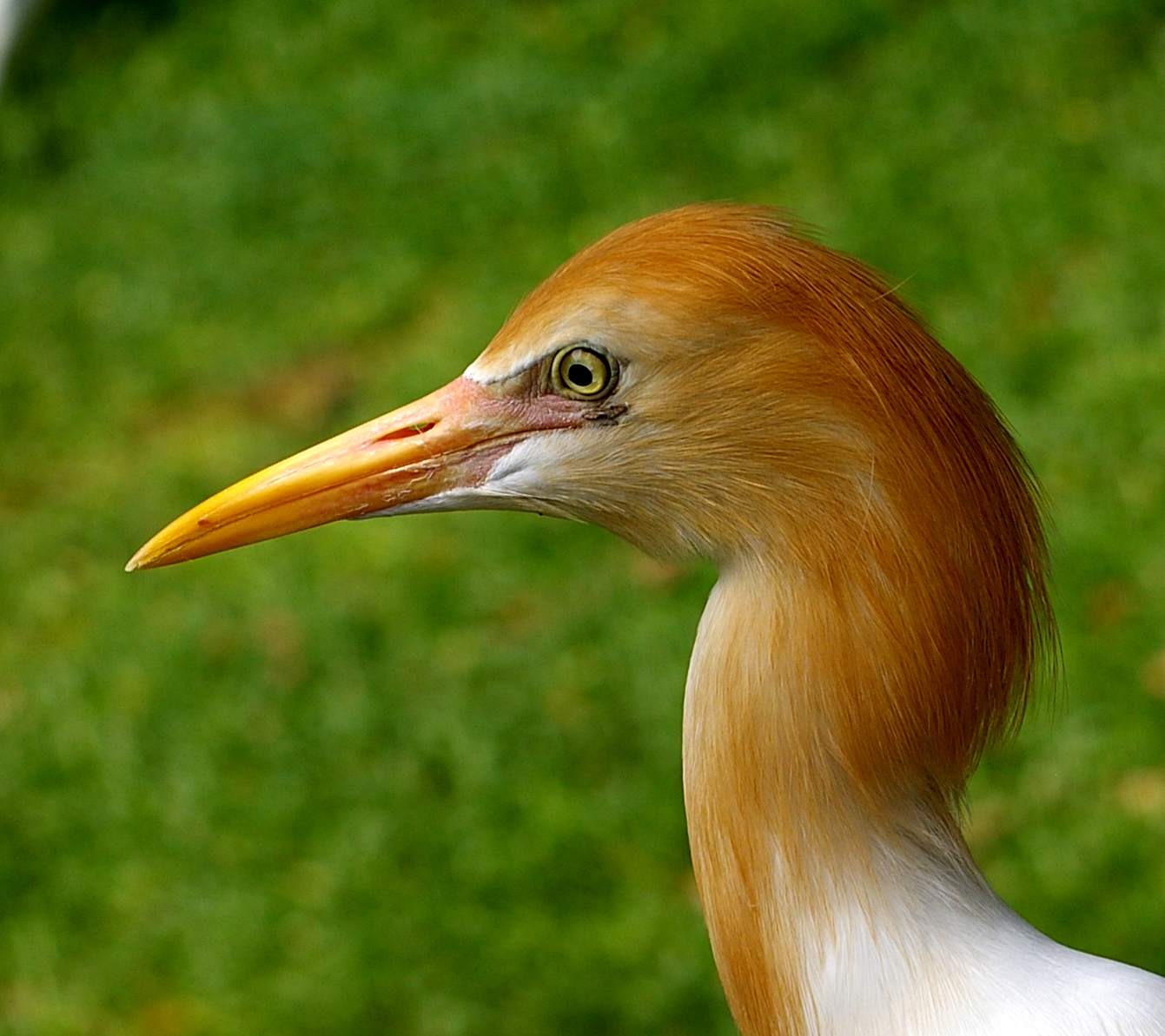
Cattle egret

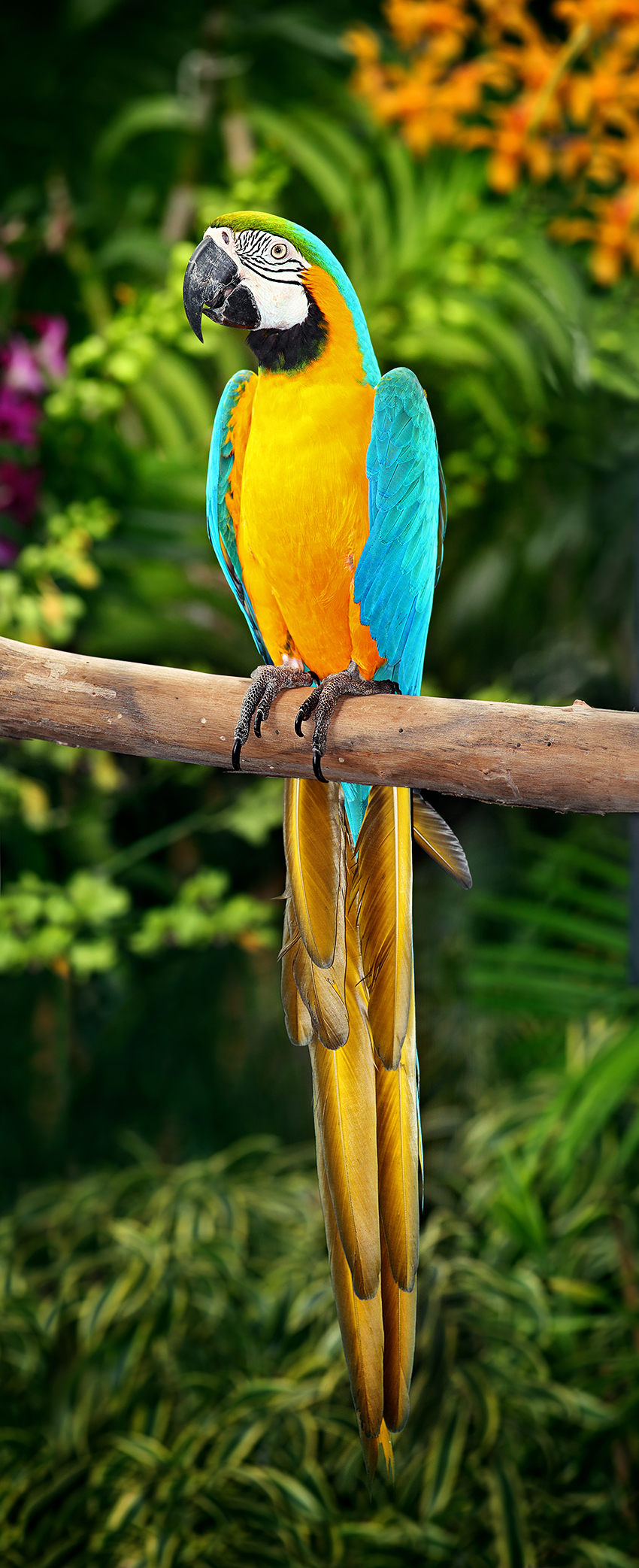
Blue-and-yellow macaw

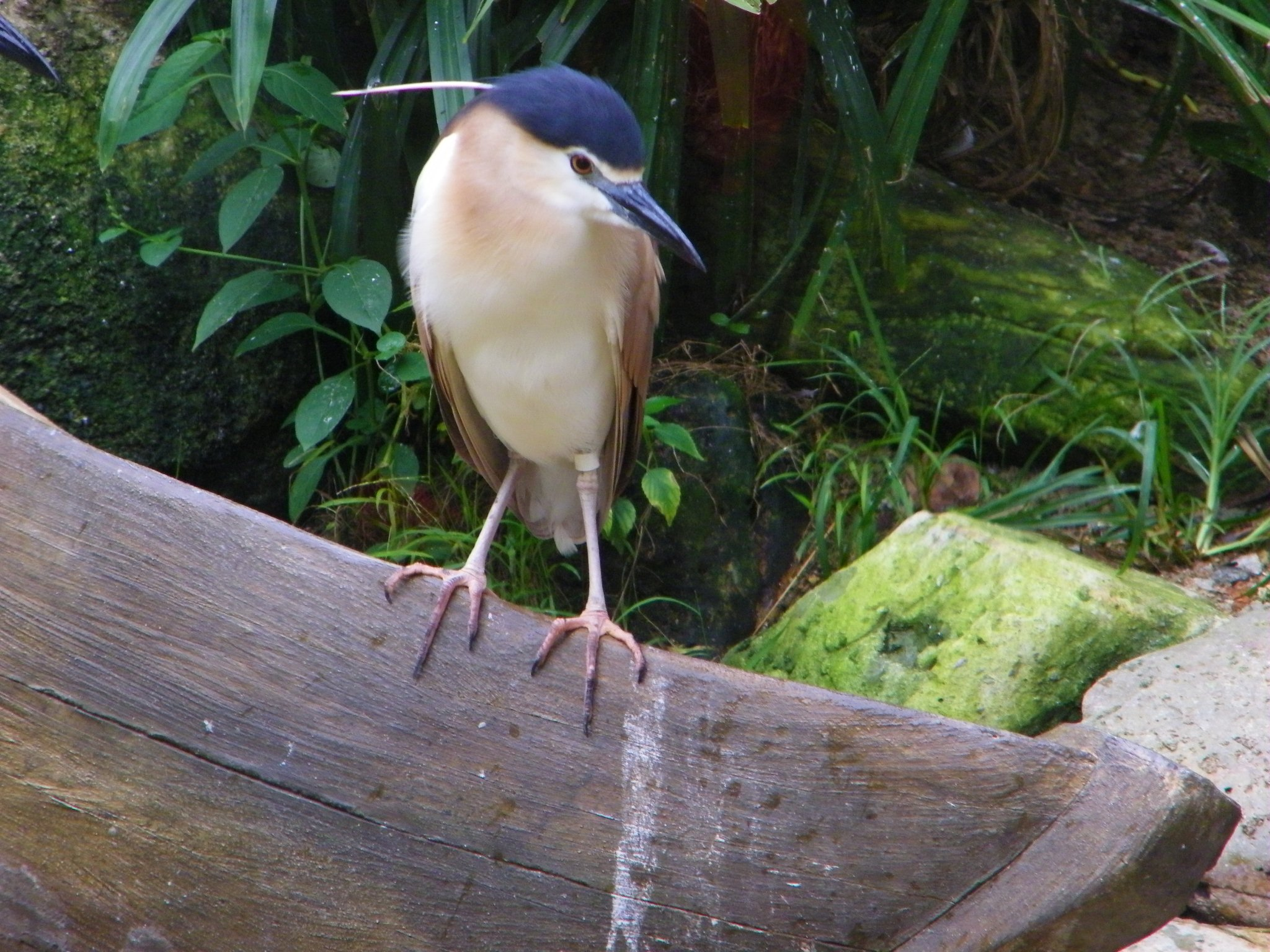
Rufous night heron

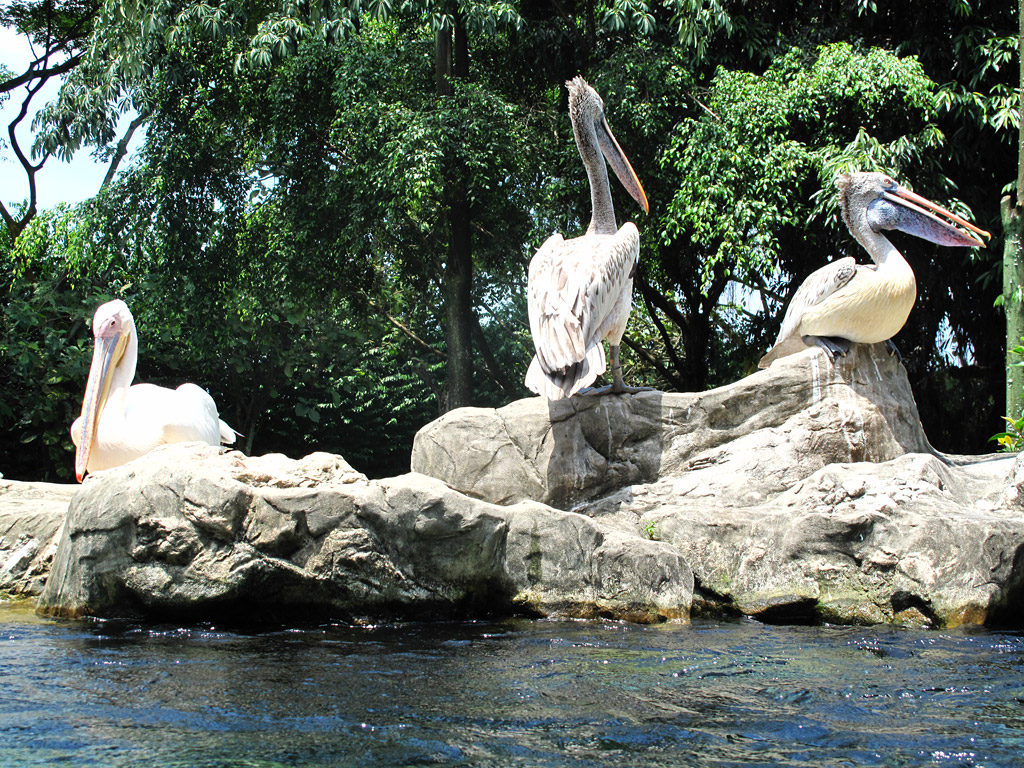
Pelicans

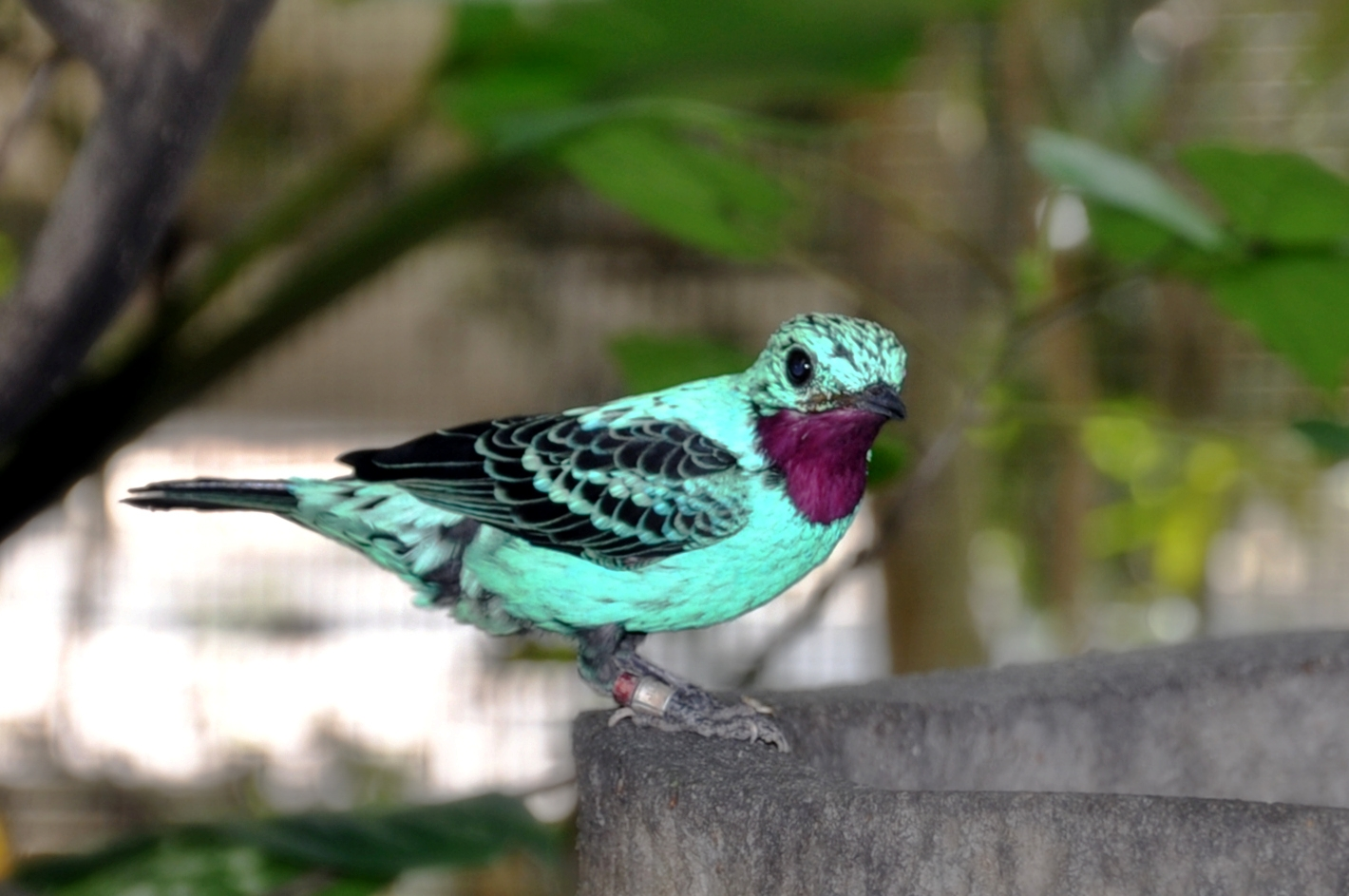
Spangled cotinga

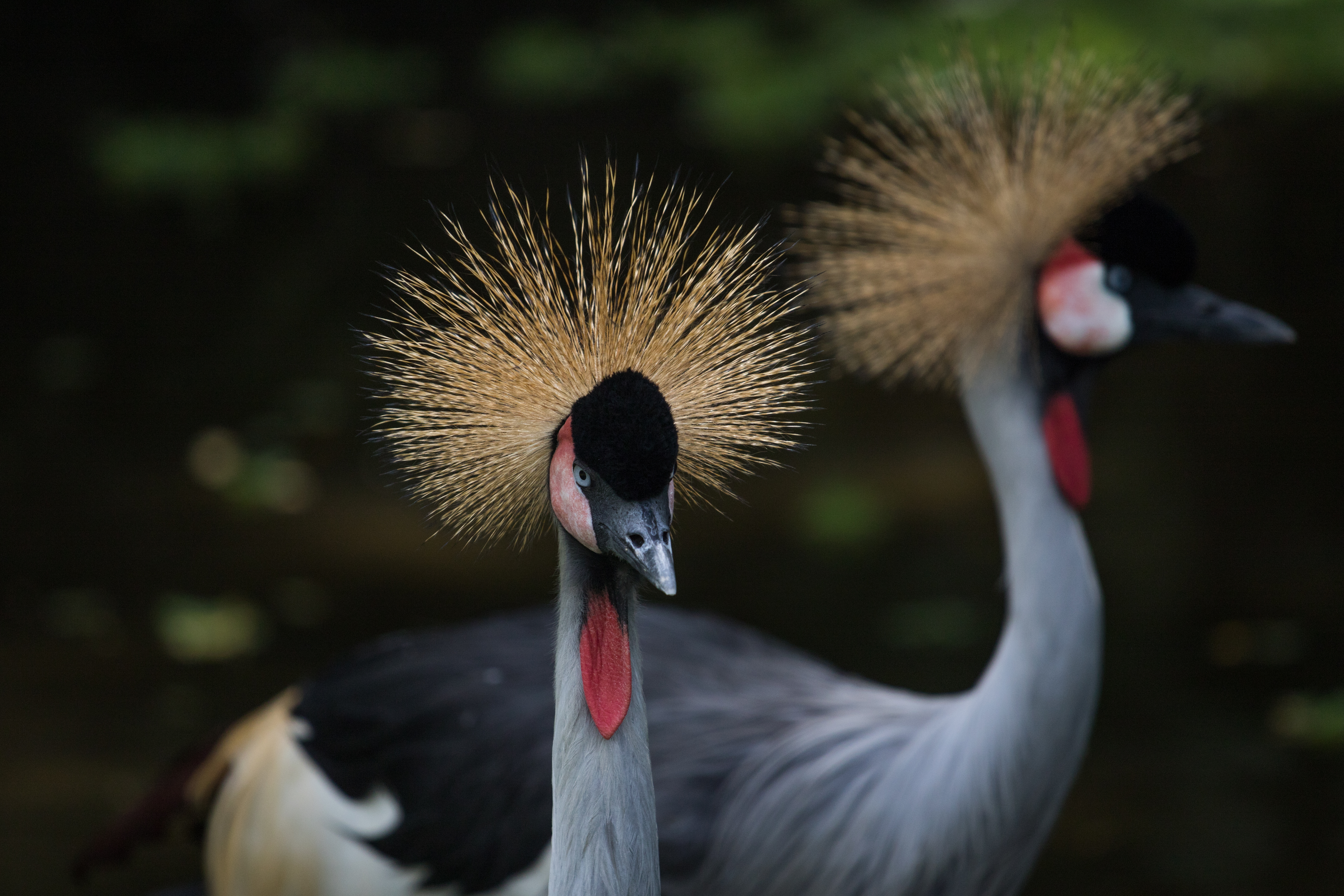
Grey crowned crane

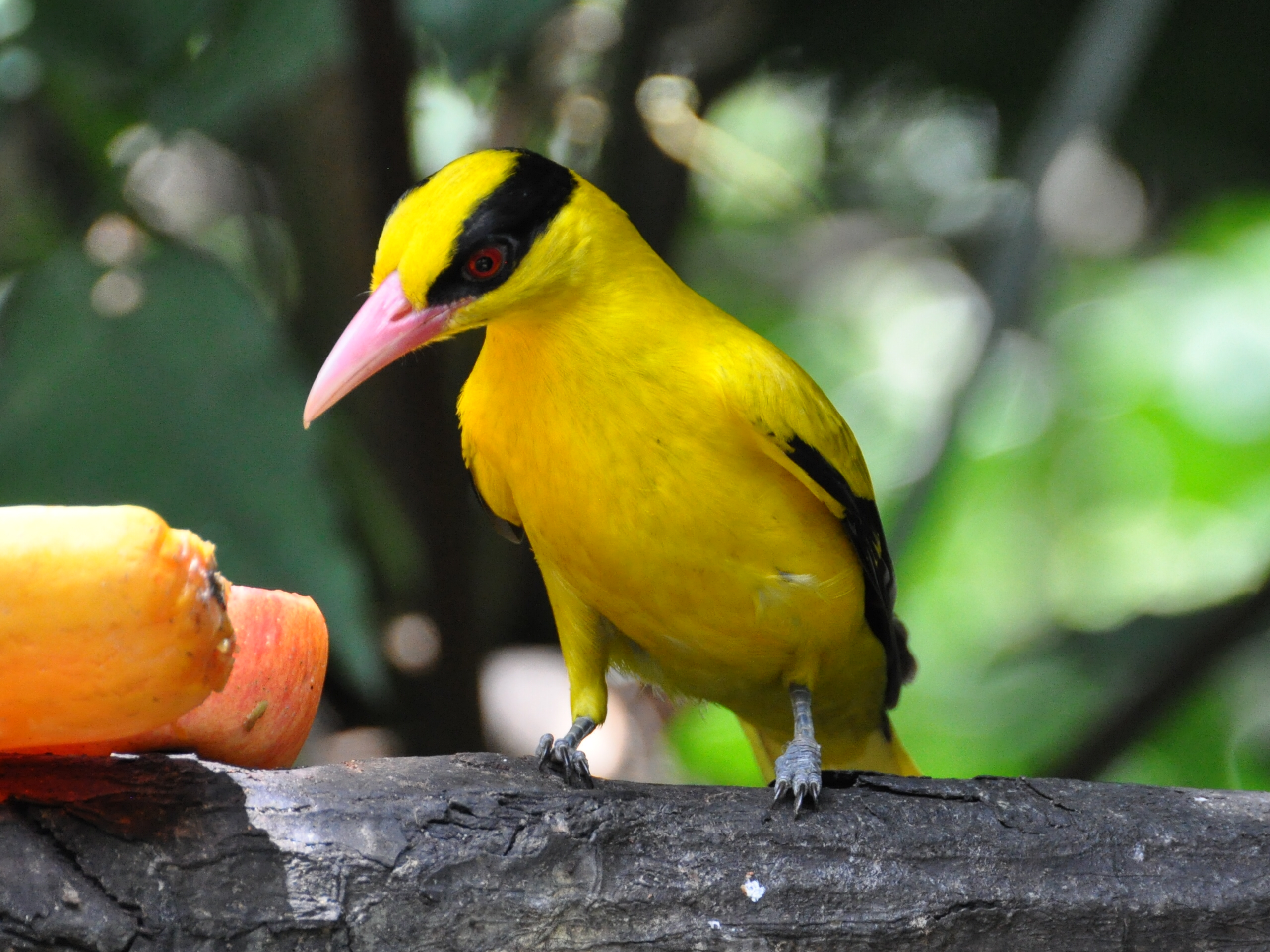
Black-naped oriole

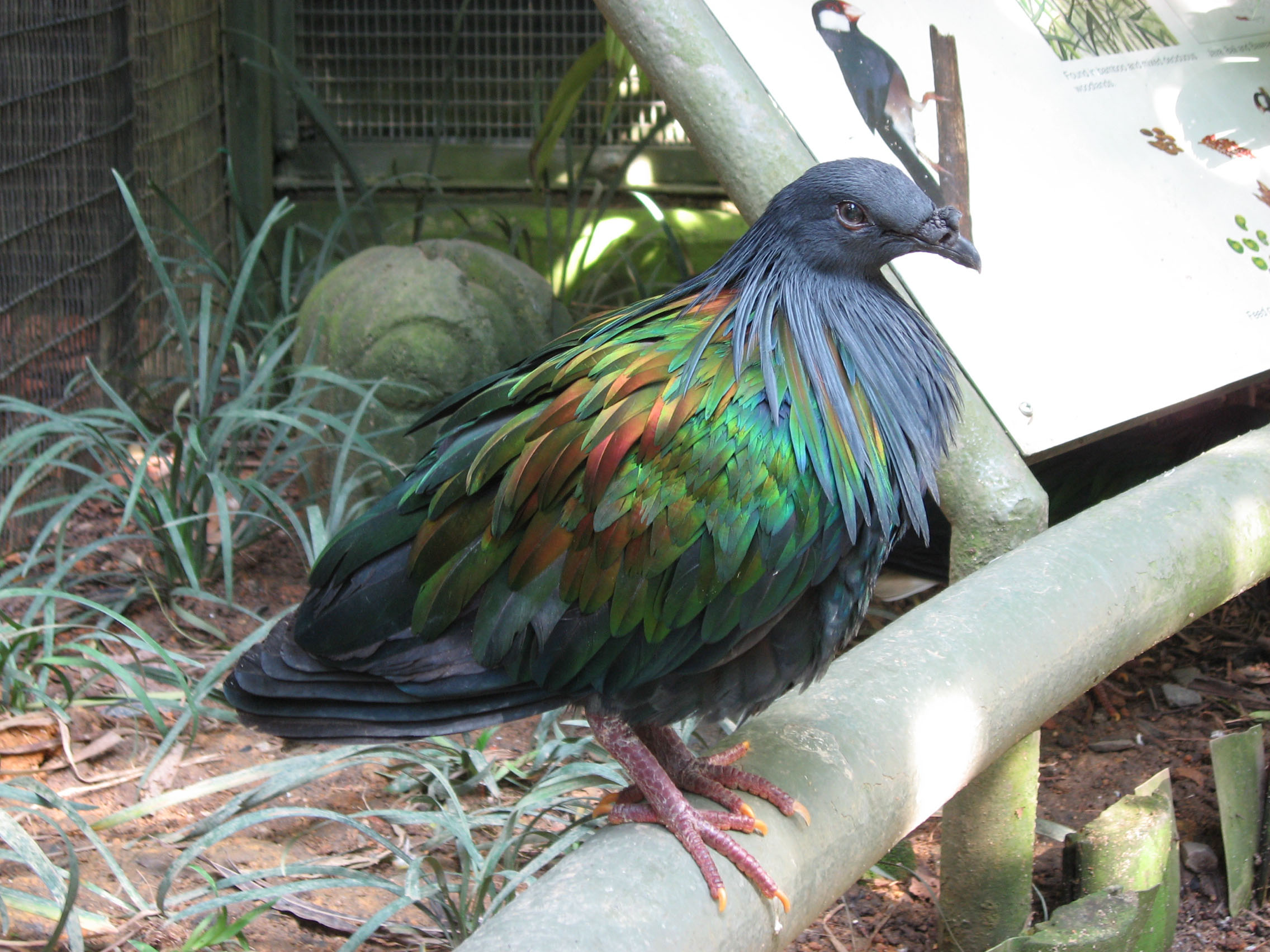
Nicobar pigeon

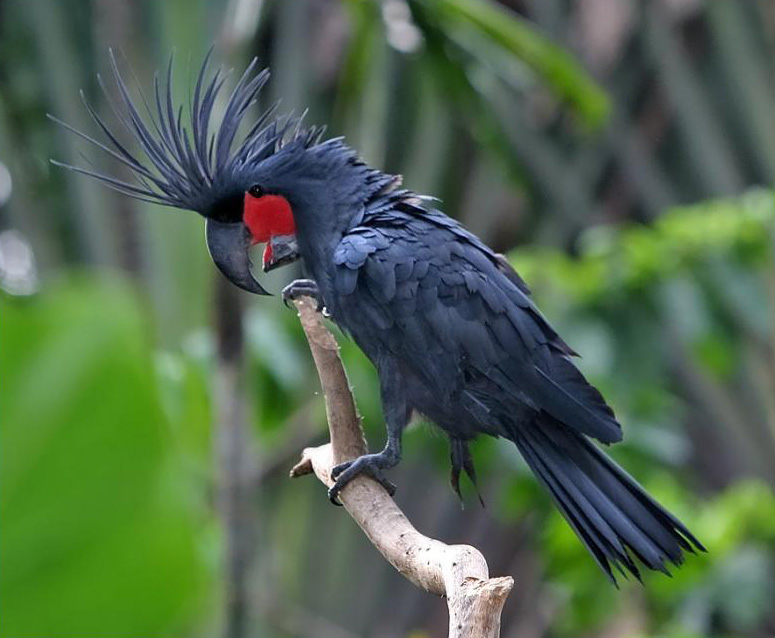
Palm cockatoo

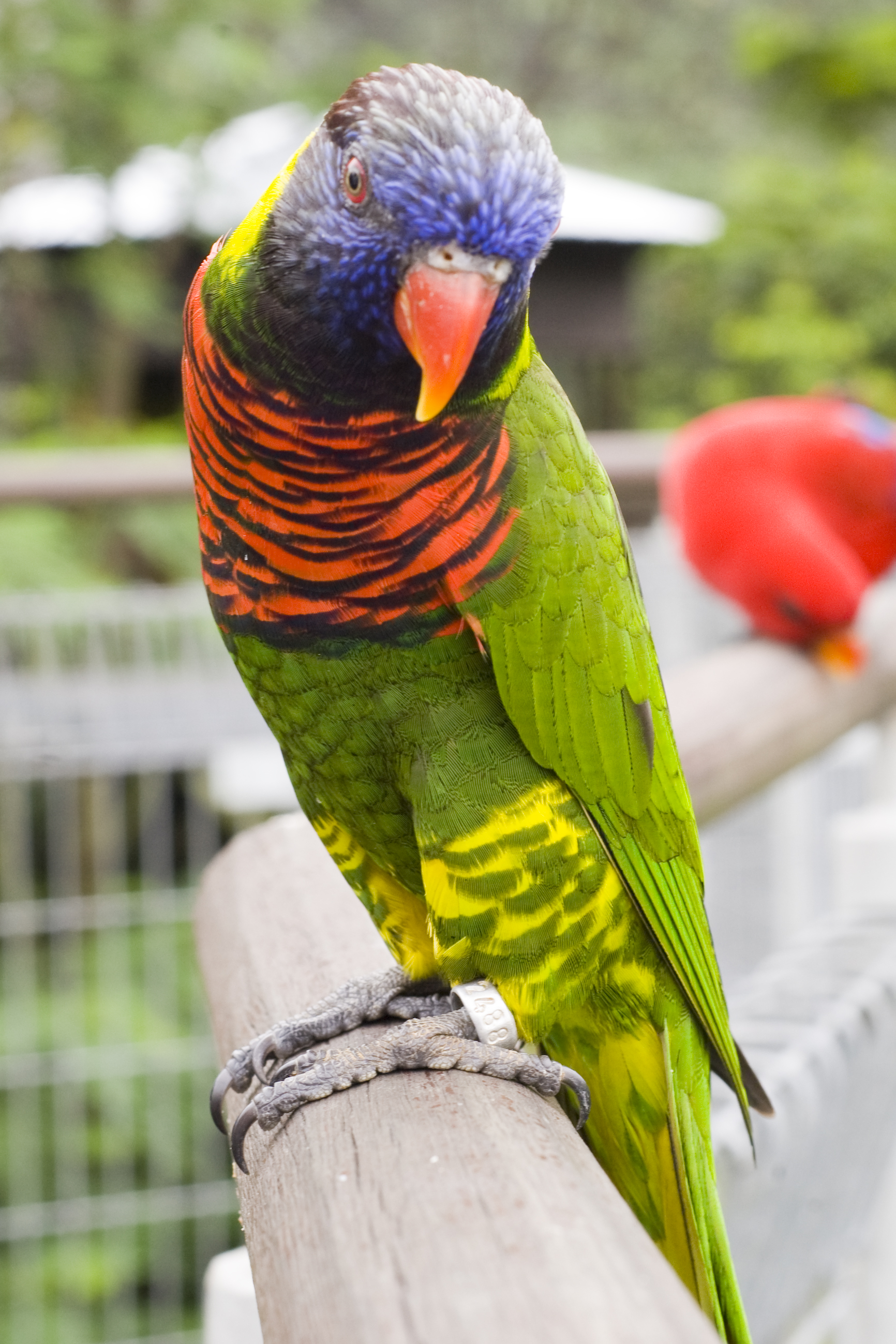
Coconut lorikeet

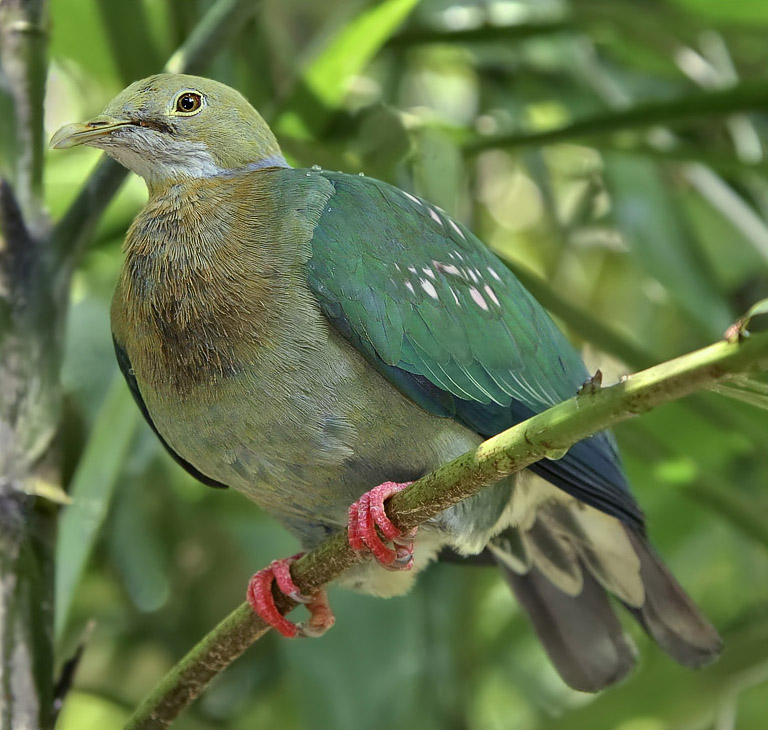
Pink-spotted fruit-dove

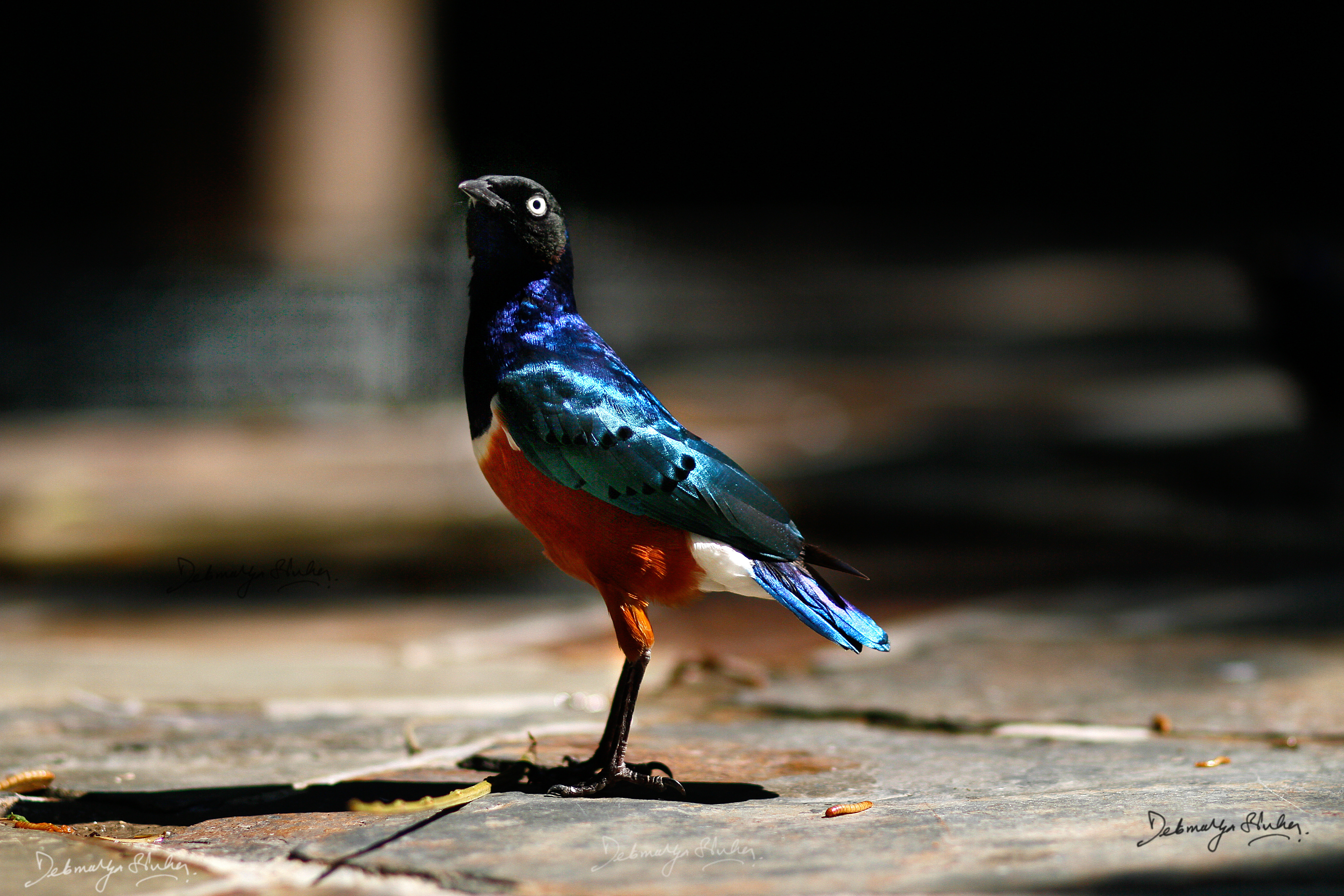
Superb starling

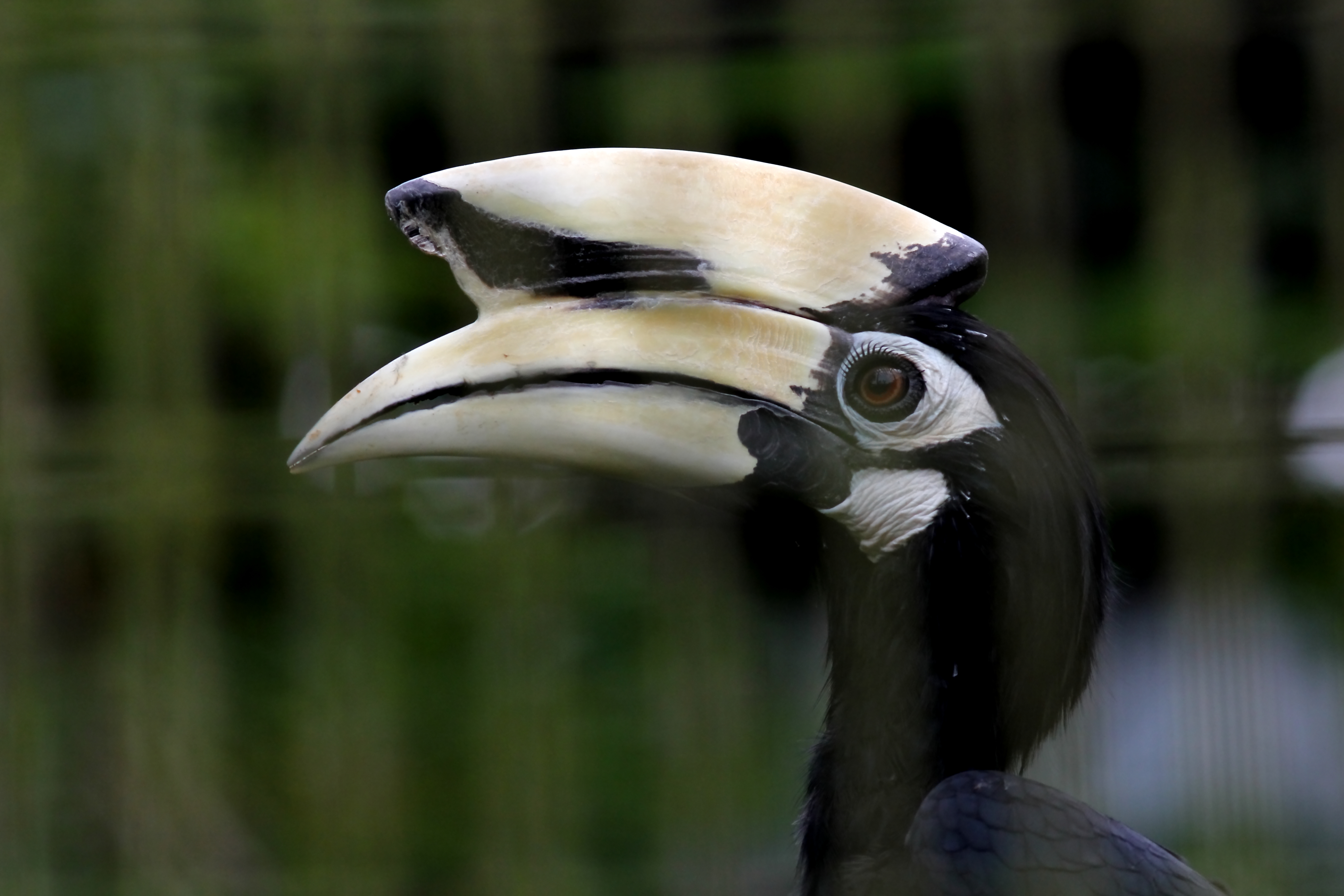
Oriental pied hornbill

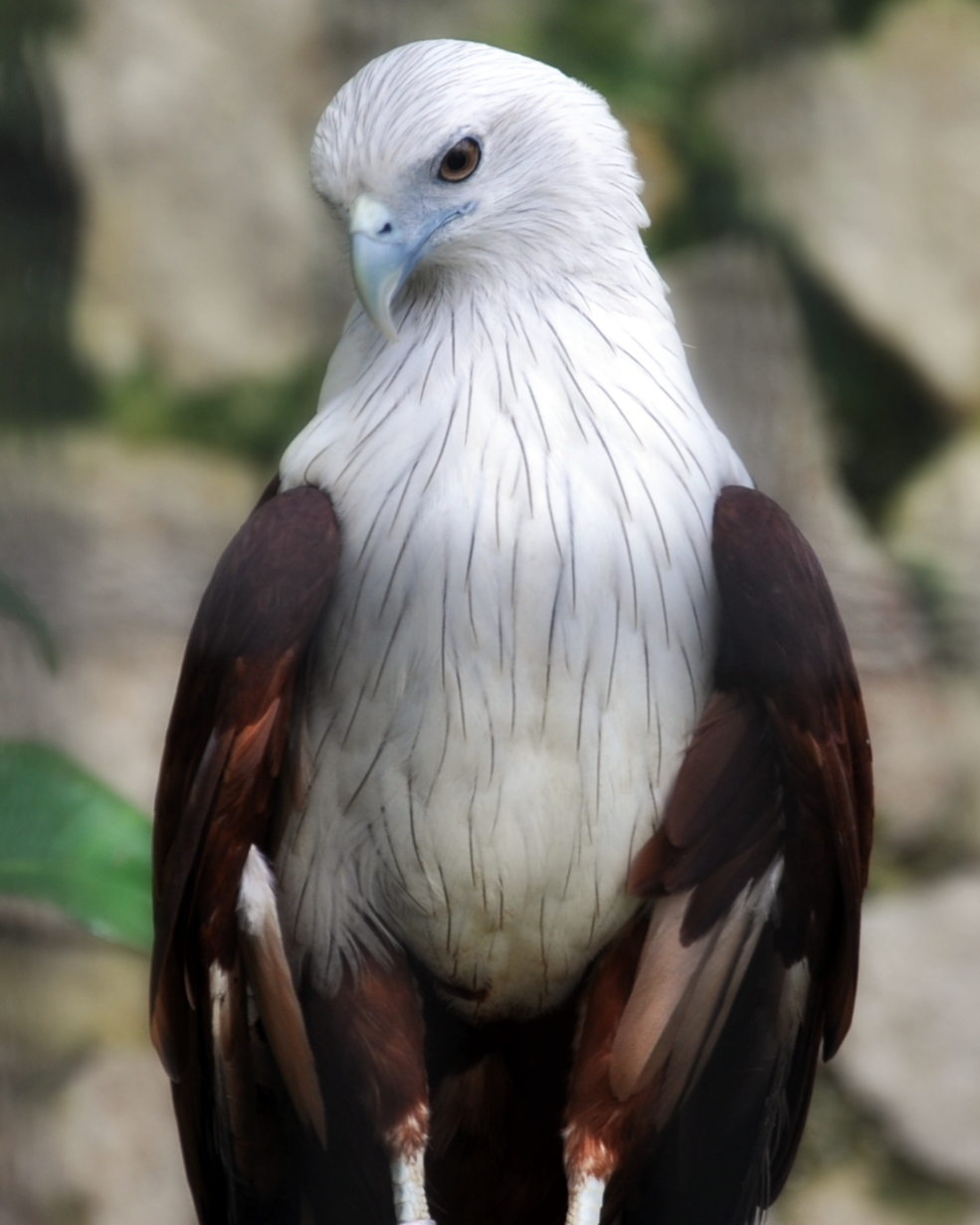
Brahminy kite

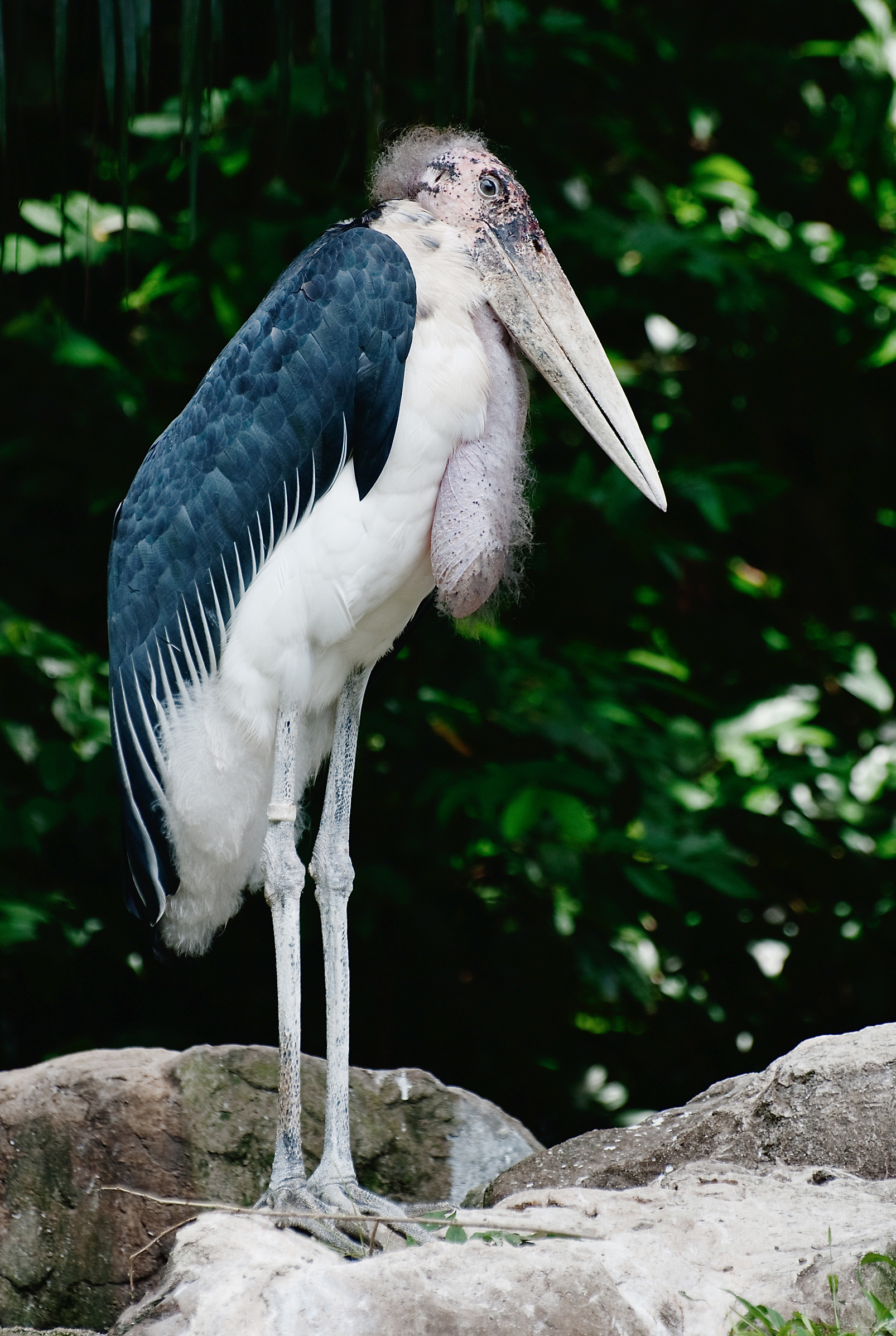
Marabou stork

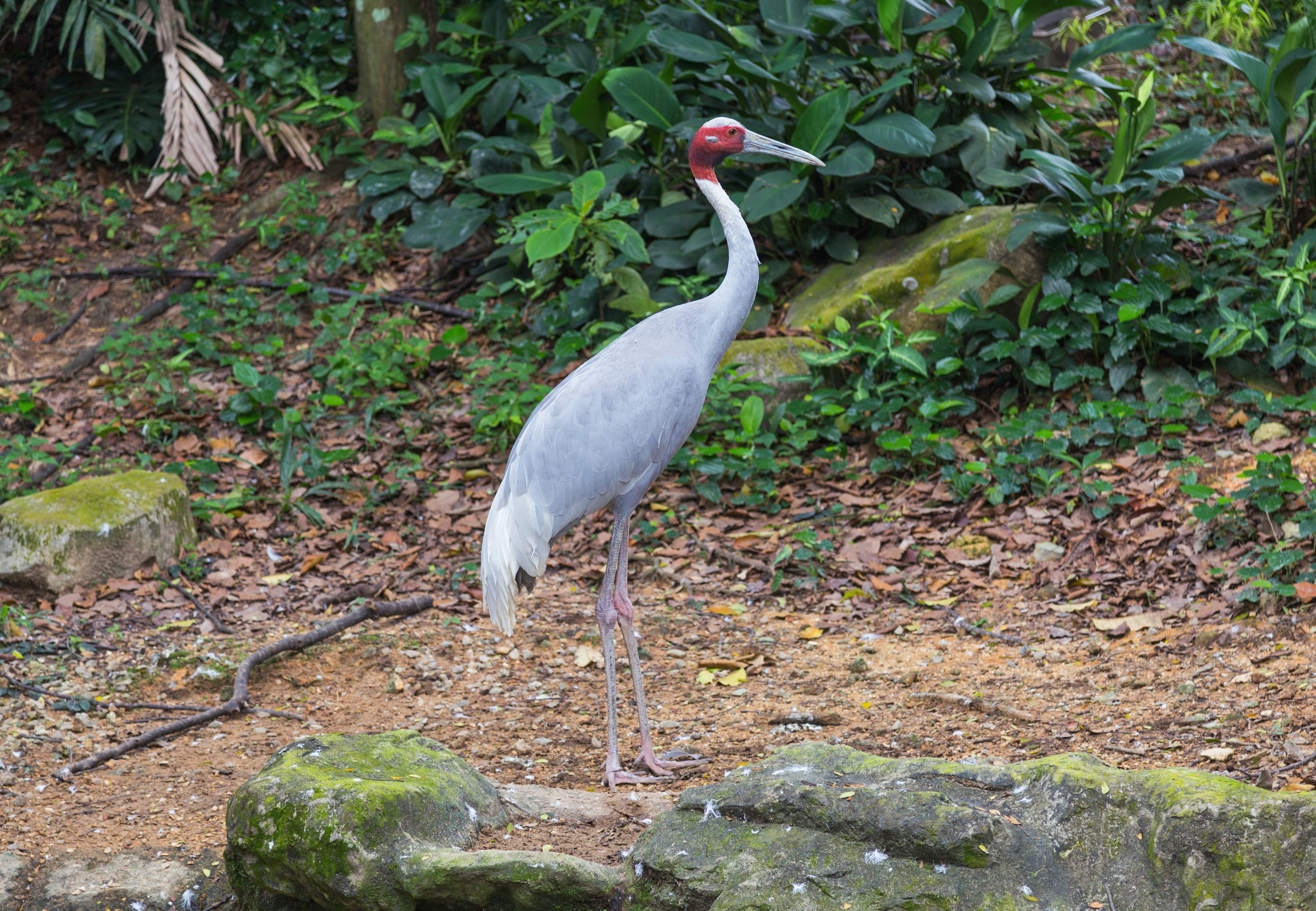
Sarus crane

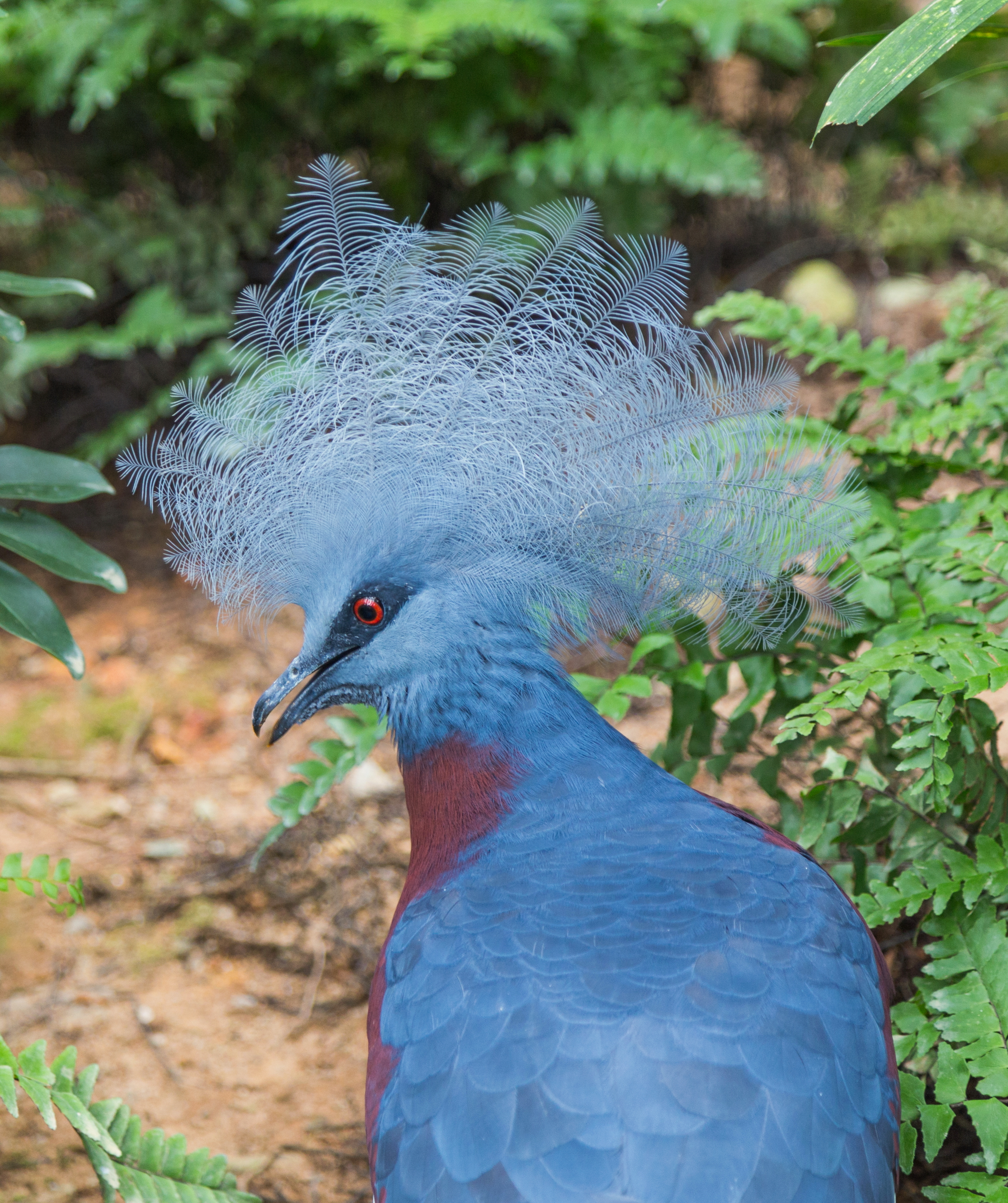
Victoria crowned pigeon

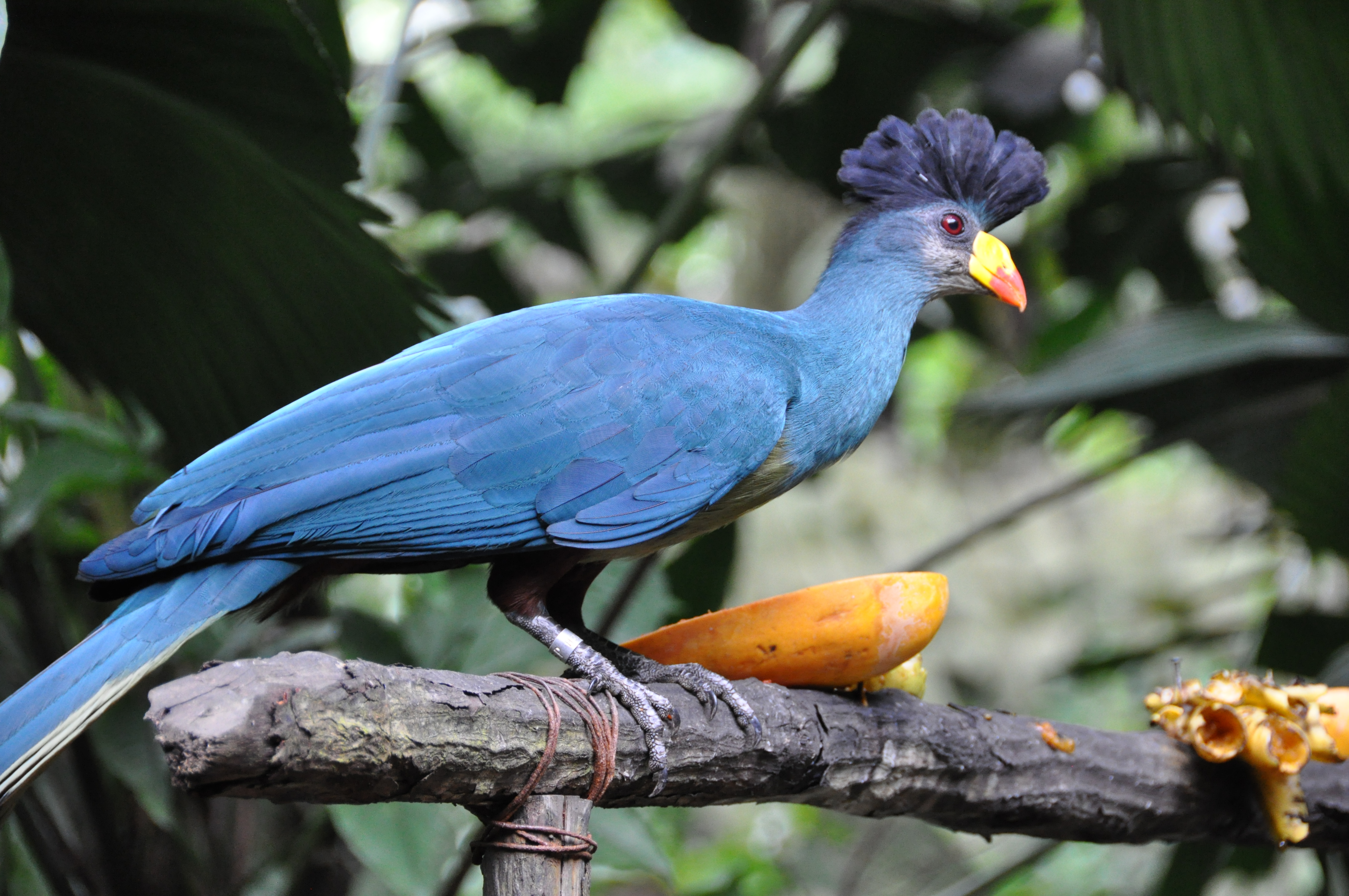
Great blue turaco

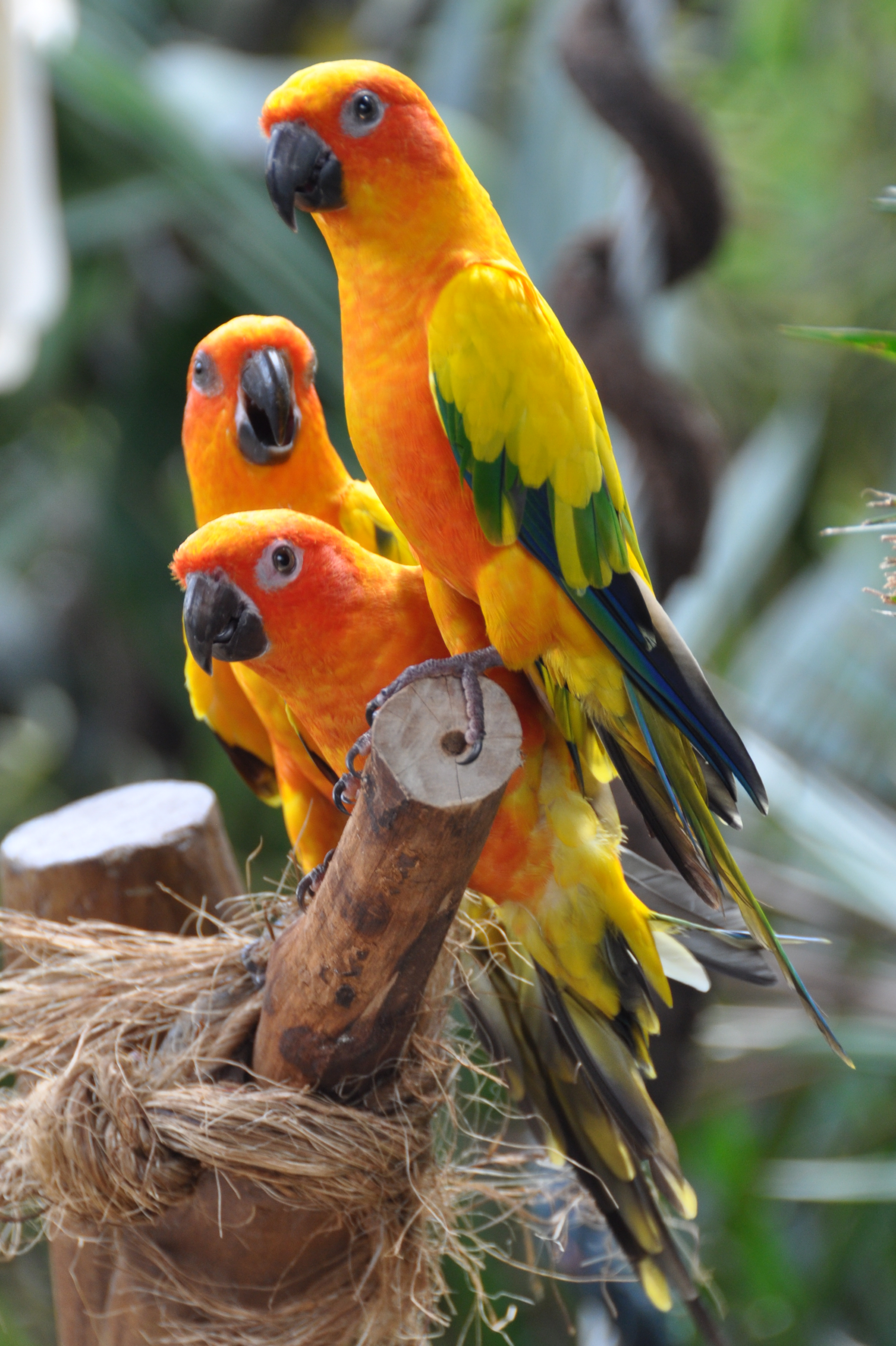
Sun parakeet

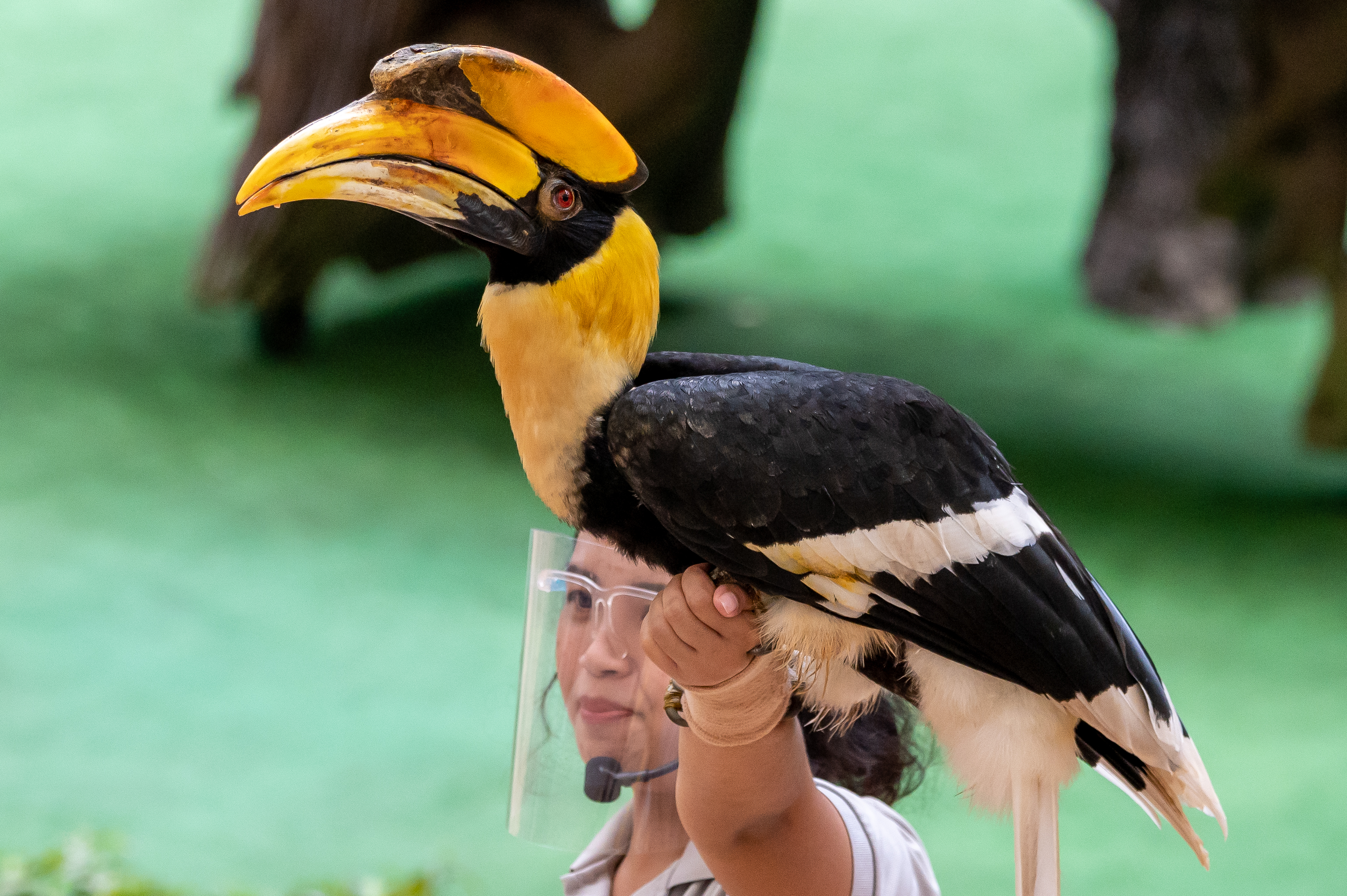
Great hornbill

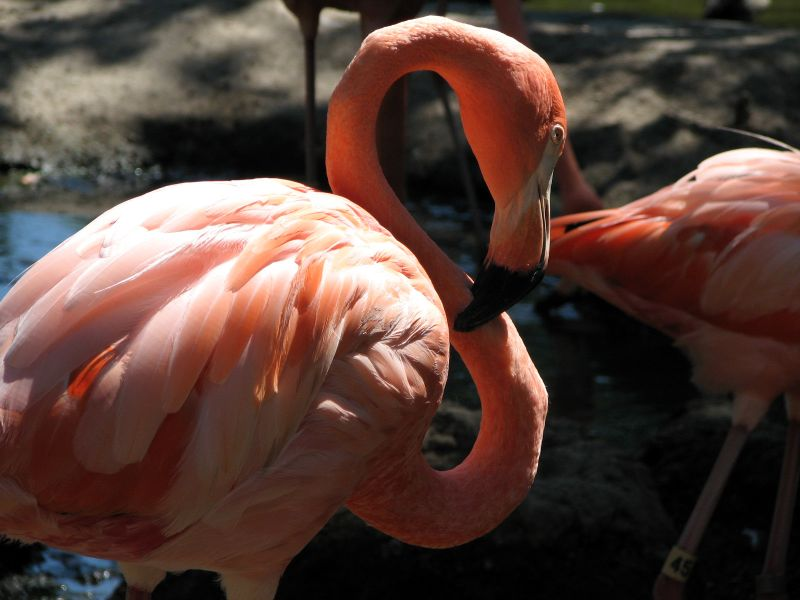
American flamingo

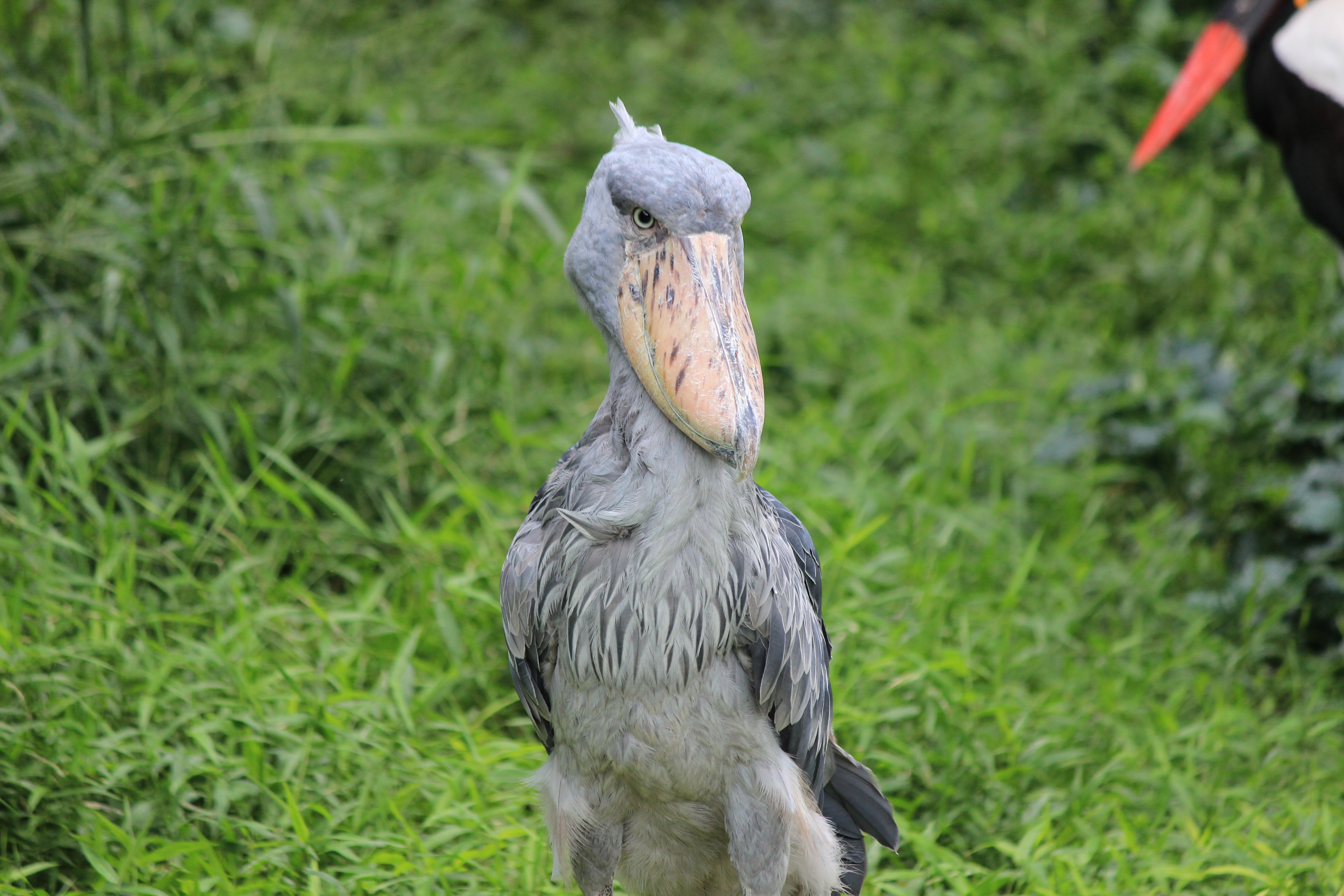
Shoebill

== See also ==
- Gardens by the Bay
- Night Safari
- River Wonders
- Singapore Botanic Gardens
- Singapore Zoo
- Bird Paradise

== Bibliography ==
- Véronique Sanson (1992). Gardens and Parks of Singapore. Oxford University Press. ISBN 978-0-19-588588-0.
