= Jurong Bird Park Panorail =

Defunct monorail system in Jurong Bird Park, Singapore

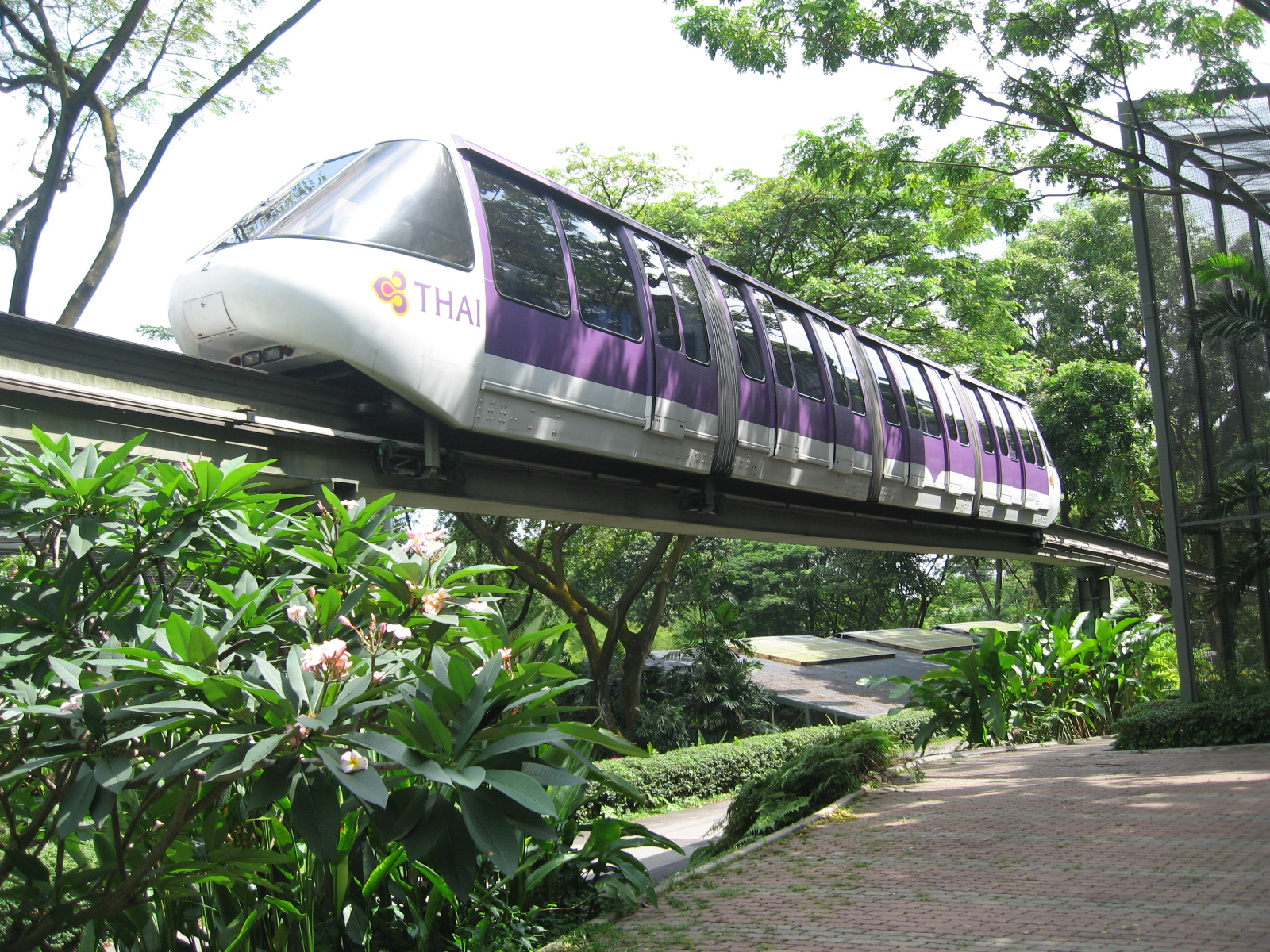

Overview
- Native name: Malay: Sistem Panorail Taman Burung Jurong; Chinese: 飞禽公园单轨列车
- Locale: Jurong Bird Park
- Transit type: Straddle-beam monorail
- Number of lines: 1
- Number of stations: 3
- Website: Official website (archived 14 April 2012)

Operation
- Began operation: 11 April 1992; 34 years ago
- Ended operation: April 2012

Technical
- System length: 1.7 km (1.1 mi)

The Jurong Bird Park Panorail was a monorail system for the Jurong Bird Park in Singapore. Measuring 1.7-kilometre (1.1 mi), it went around the park in a loop with three stations.

Prior to the monorail's opening, diesel trams were used to transport visitors around the park, which were deemed to be big, noisy, and hot by April 1988. Plans were conceptualised in the same month. Construction began in November 1990 and the system was launched on 11 April 1992.

Planned by Von Roll, a monorail was chosen as it would not emit pollution and create noise. The monorail system used 4 fully air-conditioned four-car trains which travelled around the park in approximately 11 minutes. It ceased operations in 2012 and was replaced by a tram service.

== History ==
Prior to the monorail, diesel trams were used to transport visitors around Jurong Bird Park, which were deemed to be "big, noisy, and hot" by April 1988. Plans for the monorail were first conceptualised in the same month and was expected to be done within five years time. By April 1990, it was reported in The Straits Times that the monorail will be opened by mid-next year. A sign promoting the monorail development with two stations and four trains was sighted at the park in June, with confirmation from a spokesman that there was a monorail planned.

In September 1990, it was announced that the monorail system would cost S$18 million (US$9.93 million) as part of a S$30 million (US$16.55 million) development programme for the bird park. It was expected to be finished by next year for Jurong Bird Park's 20th anniversary. Construction began in November 1990. Its viaducts were painted in green to blend in with the natural environment. It was scheduled to open in September 1991.

An unveiling ceremony for the trains was held on 16 September 1991, with the system announced as the "Panorail" in the same month. It was launched by President Wee Kim Wee on 11 April 1992, the 21st anniversary of the park. It was announced on 12 August 1994 that the Panorail will be closed until 7 September for upgrading works on the tracks and trains.

The panorail ceased operations in 2012. The panorail was still listed on the official website as of 14 April 2012, but was replaced by a trackless tram service listing by 3 May 2012.

External media
- The sign for the monorail development By The New Paper
- Artist's impression of the monorail system By The Straits Times
- Photograph of the monorail's rolling stock By The Straits Times
- President Wee Kim Wee at the monorail's opening By The Straits Times

== Details ==
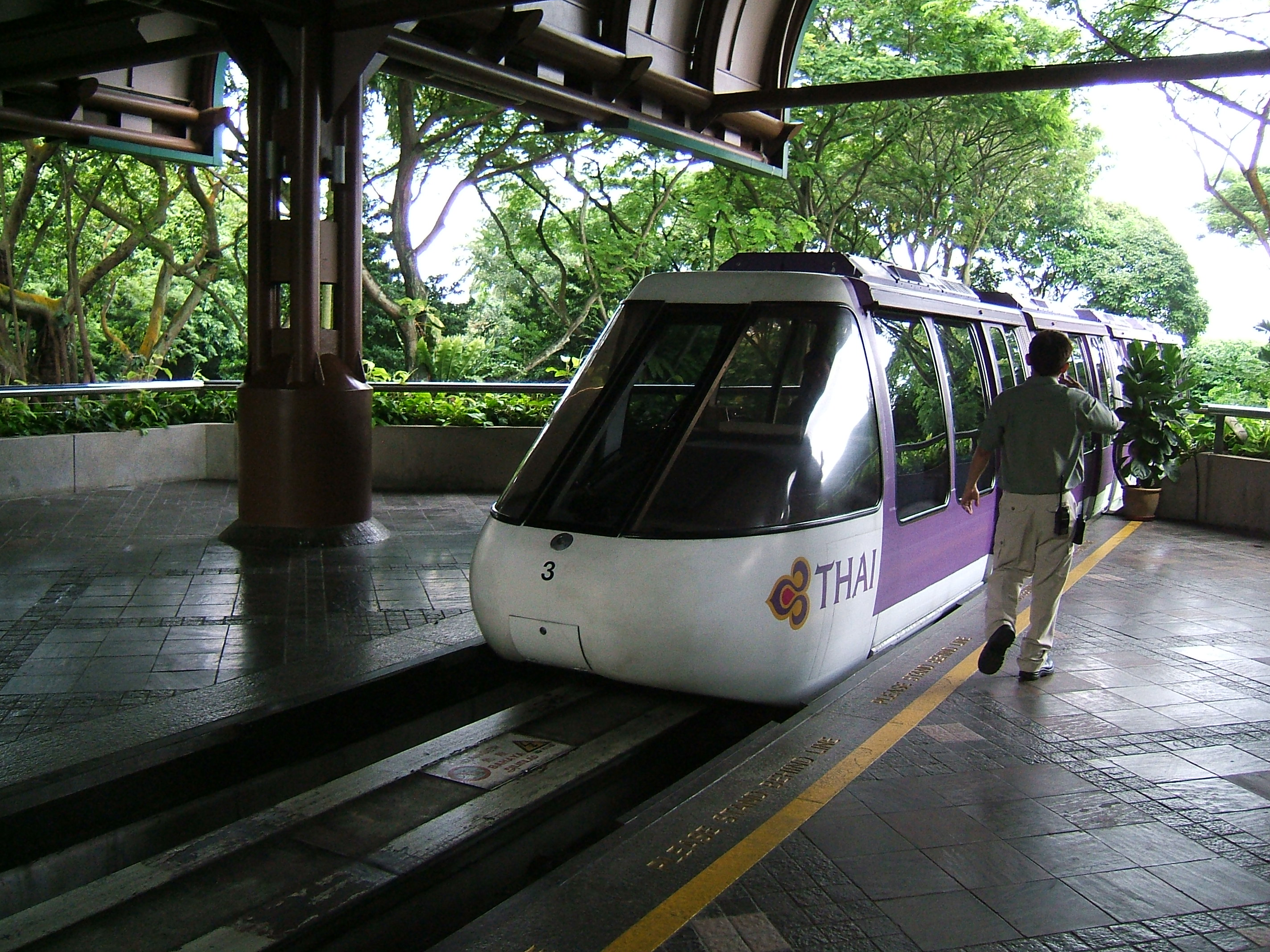
A monorail entering a panorail station in October 2009

The Jurong Bird Park Panorail is a 1.7 kilometres (1.1 mi) monorail system. Planned by Vonroll Transport Systems, a monorail was chosen as the executive director of the park, S.Thiruchelvam, said that a monorail would run silently and not emit pollution as it would be powered by electricity. It was also intended to facilitate closer contact between visitors and the birds. The "Panorail" part was named as the system provided a "panoramic" view of the park's landscape.

=== Route description ===
The route for the Jurong Bird Park Panorail follows similarly to the park. It starts from the Main station, which is near the entrance. The entire journey took roughly 11 mins. The Jurong Bird Park Panorail had three stations. Each station had an elevator for the elderly and handicapped. Part of the panorail's route entered an aviary, which was promoted as "the only one of its kind in the world".

Defunct stations photographed in 2022

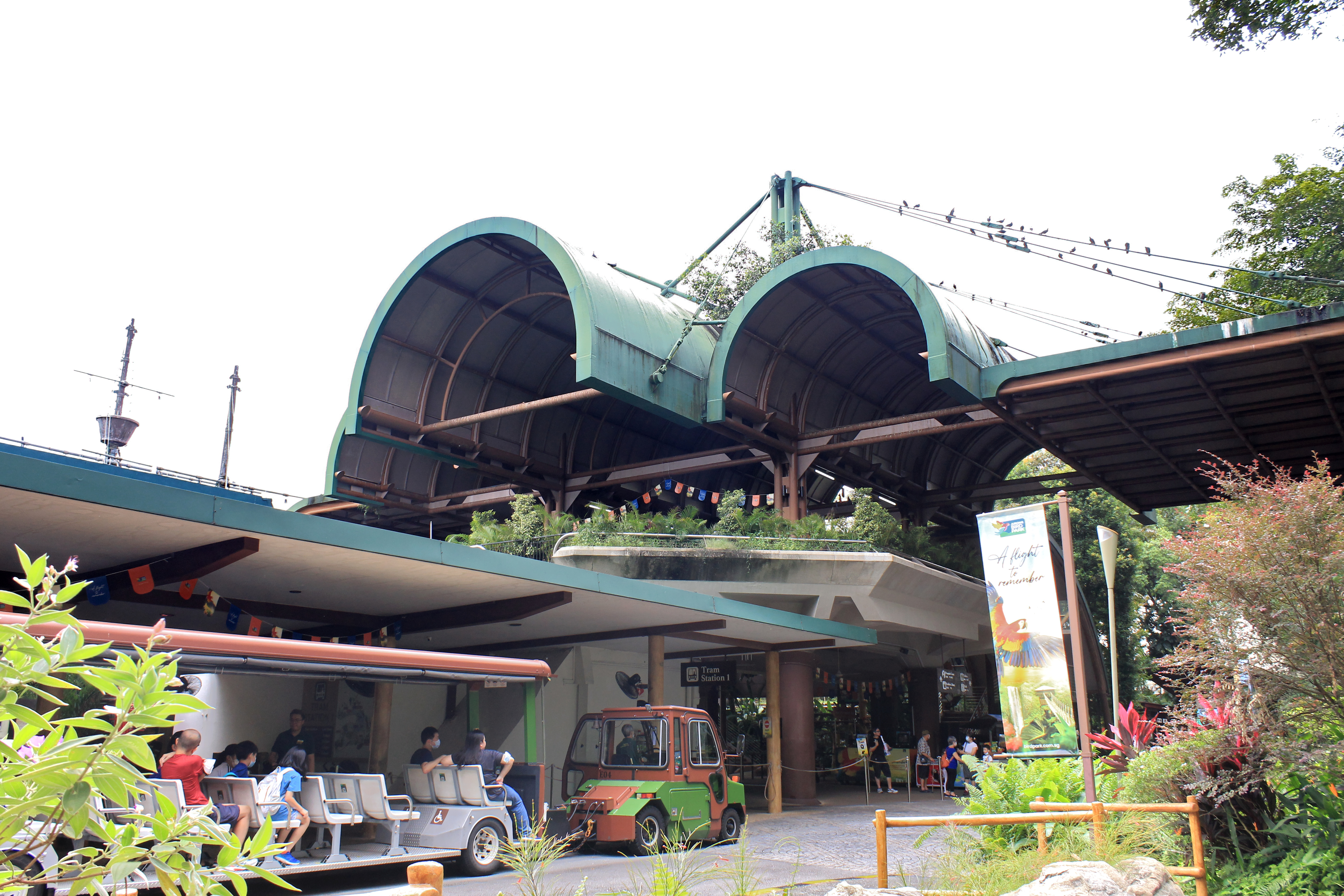
Main Station, near the entrance and amphitheater

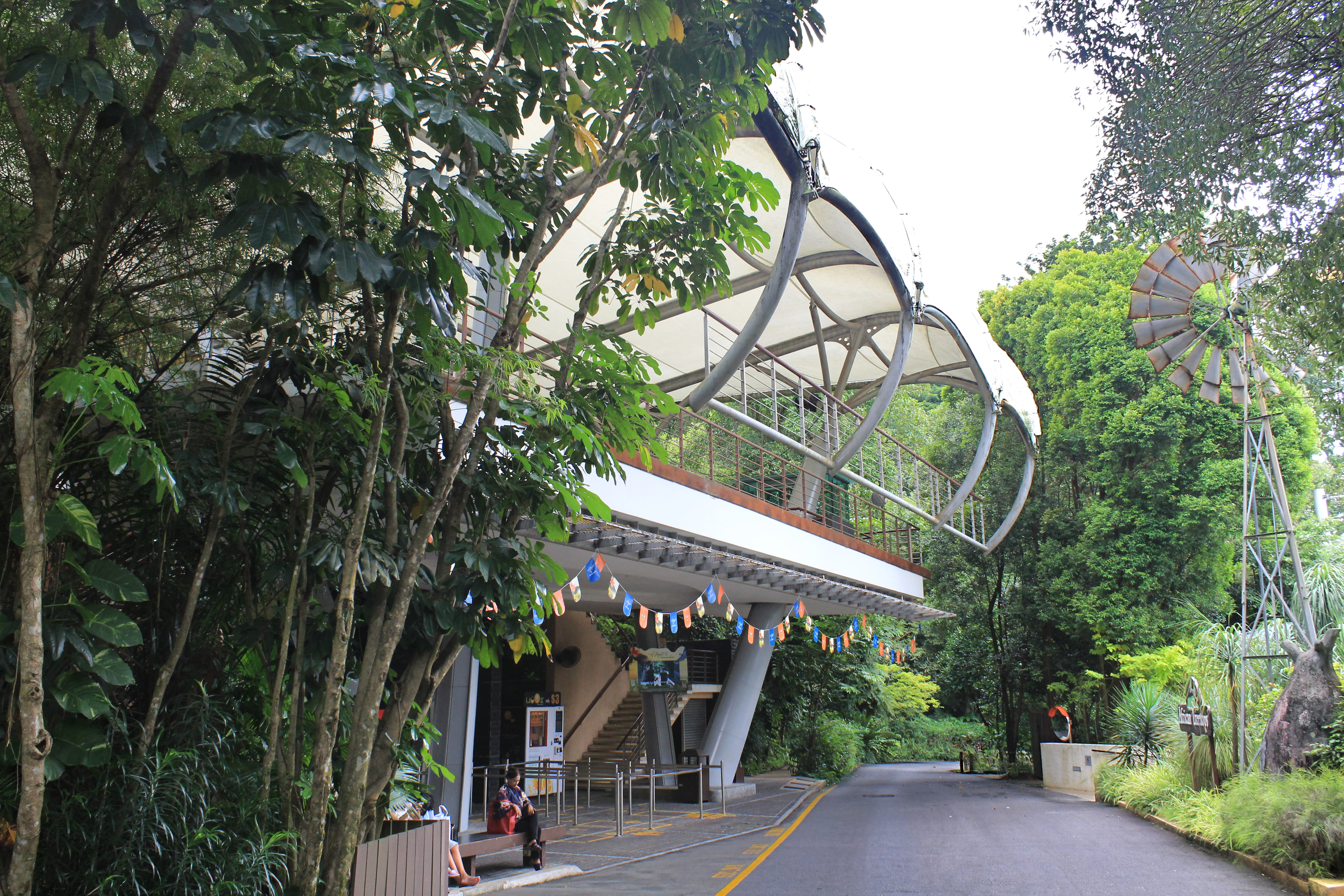
Lory Loft Station, near the Lory Loft

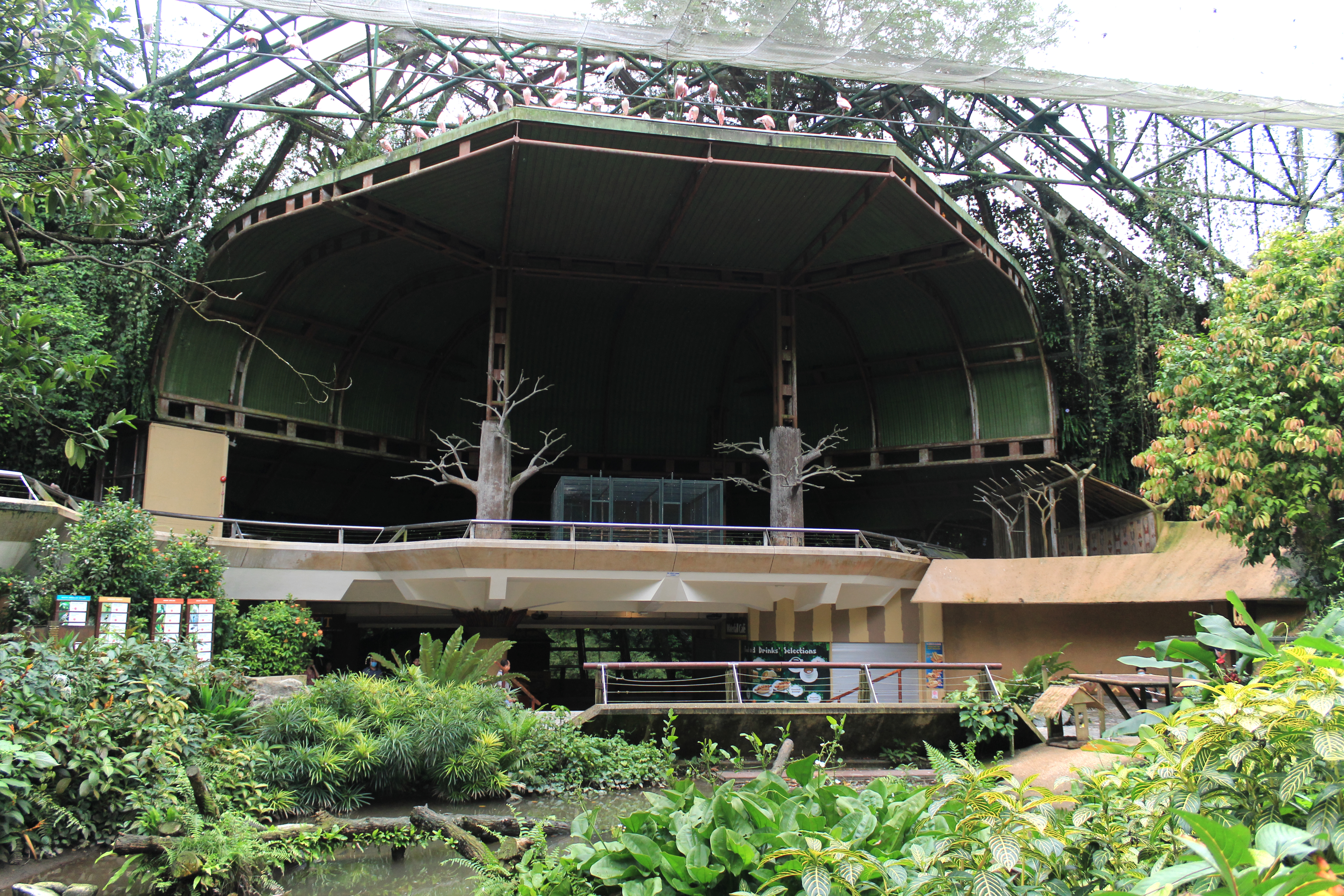
Waterfall Station, near the Waterfall Aviary and Jurong Falls

=== Rolling stock ===
The Jurong Bird Park Panorail had 4 trains in its system, being the Kingfisher, Pelican, Cockatoo, and Woodpecker. Each train had 4 cars, with the last car having wider doors and fold-up chairs for the elderly and disabled. Built by Vonroll Transport Systems, the trains were air conditioned and had tinted windows that went from the train's roof to knee level.
