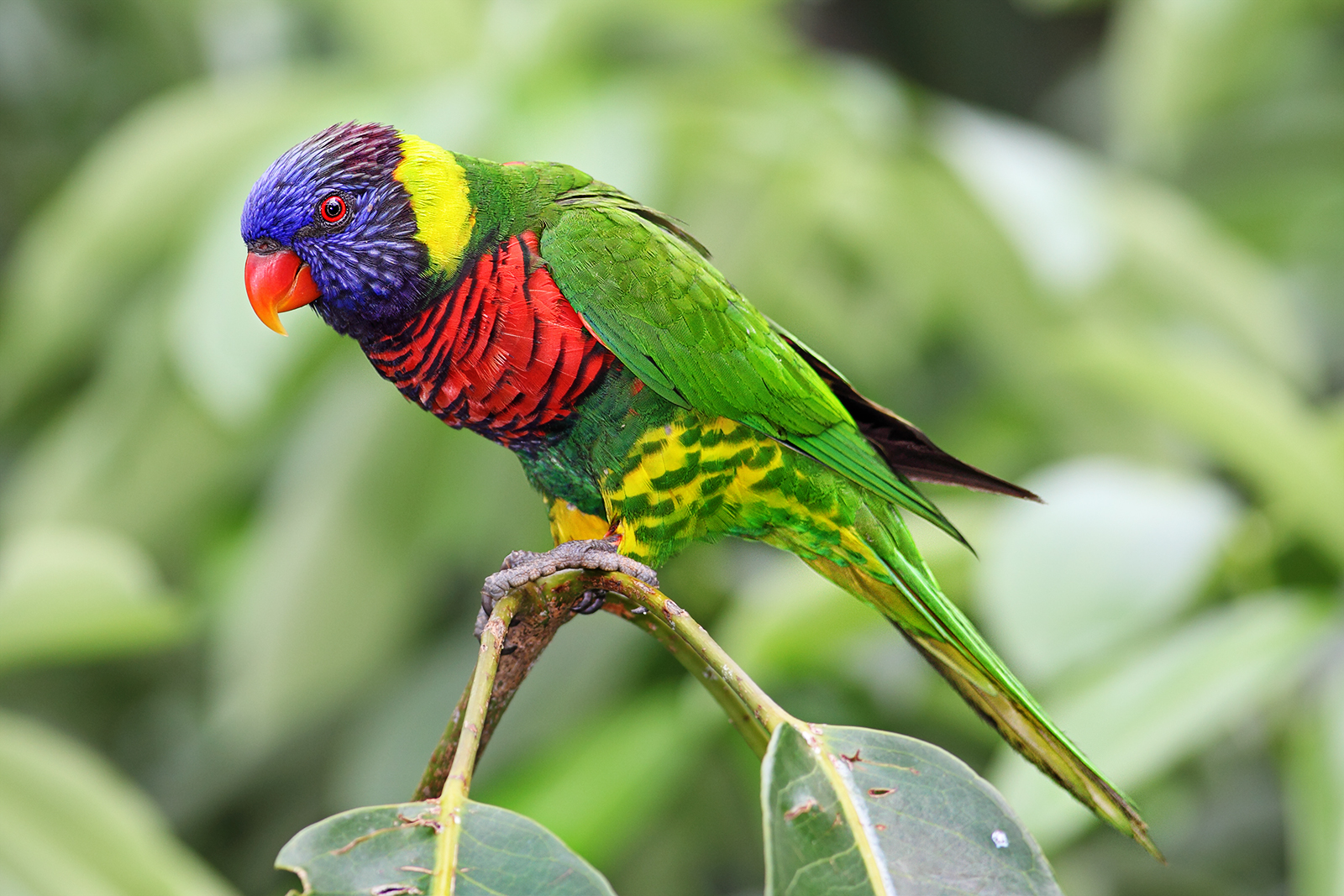
- Adult of nominate subspecies, Jurong Bird Park, Singapore

Conservation status
- Least Concern (IUCN 3.1)

Scientific classification
- Kingdom: Animalia
- Phylum: Chordata
- Class: Aves
- Order: Psittaciformes
- Family: Psittaculidae
- Genus: Trichoglossus
- Species: T. haematodus

Binomial name
- Trichoglossus haematodus (Linnaeus, 1771)

= Coconut lorikeet =

Species of bird

The coconut lorikeet (Trichoglossus haematodus), also known as the green-naped lorikeet and Swainson’s lorikeet, is a parrot in the family Psittaculidae. Several species of lorikeets now recognised as distinct were once lumped together under Trichoglossus haematodus; together they form the "rainbow lorikeet" species complex.

Trichoglossus haematodus as circumscribed today is largely restricted to Melanesia (except Fiji) and a few nearby regions. It is found from Maluku province of easternmost Indonesia across the lowlands of New Guinea, the Bismarck Archipelago, the Solomon Islands and Vanuatu to New Caledonia. Depending on the precise delimitation of species in the "rainbow lorikeet" complex, T.haematodus might barely reach Australian territory in the Torres Strait.

== Description ==
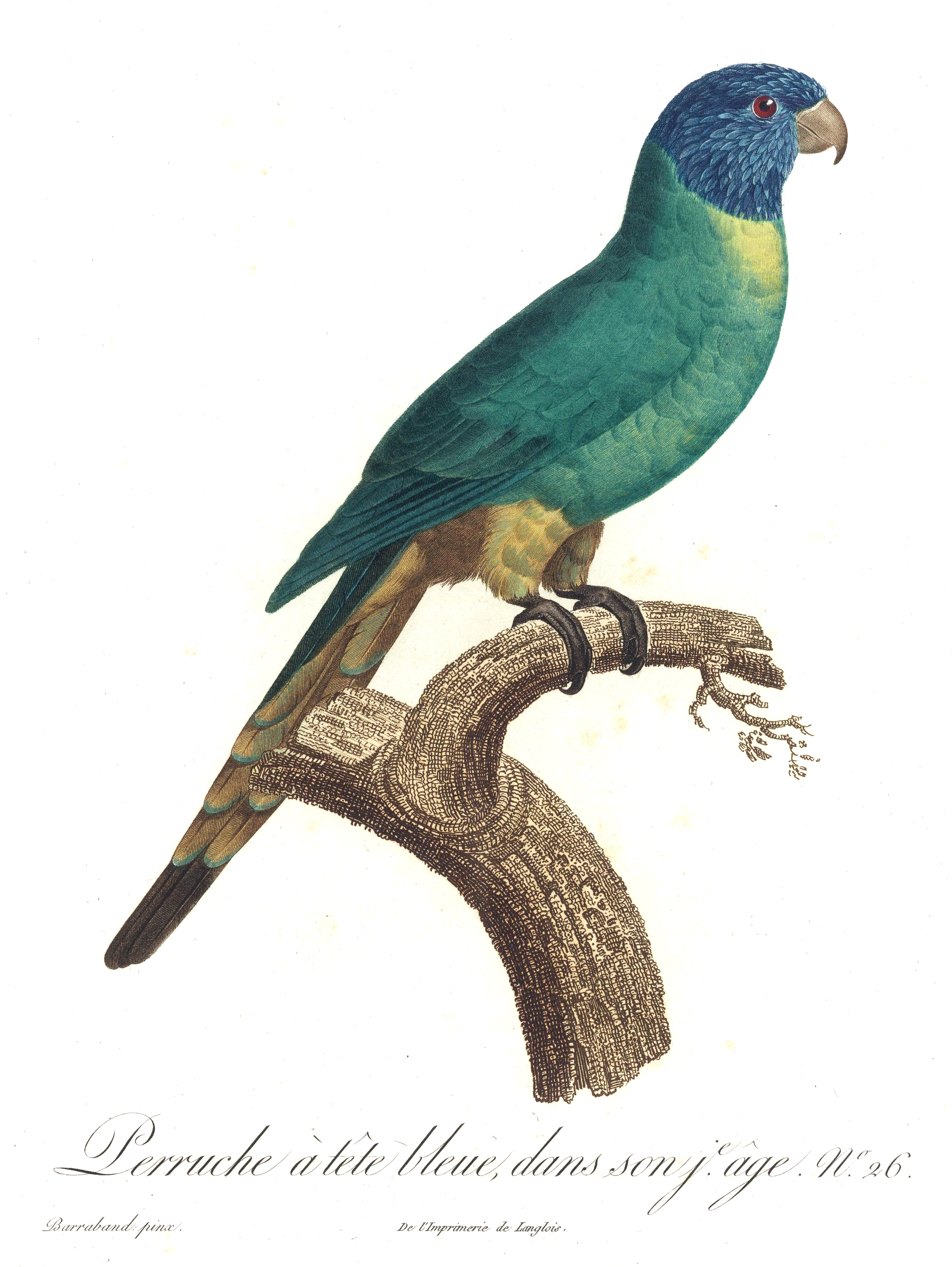
Immature from François Levaillant's 1801 book Histoire naturelle des perroquets

Coconut lorikeets typically measure around 25–30 cm (10–12 in) in length and weigh around 109–137 g (3.8–4.8 oz), but much variation exists between subspecies. The bill is orange-red, and the head clear blue fading to brown at the neck. It has a more or less extensive yellow collar and green upperparts. The breast is red, in some subspecies with more or less pronounced blue-black barring, and the belly is usually yellowish-green but in some populations its it lighter yellowish or very dark and bluish. The tail is green above and barred in green and yellow below.

The male's iris is bright red, while in the female it is orange-red, but the difference is slight and somewhat dependent on the bird's general health, and thus unreliable except for sexing mated pairs; otherwise the sexes look all alike. Young birds differ from adults by the lack of bright neck, breast, and belly coloration, and by being duller and smaller overall.

== Taxonomy and systematics ==
In 1758, English naturalist George Edwards described a lorikeet as the "red-breasted parrakeet" in his work Gleanings of Natural History. He had obtained a stuffed specimen from a China warehouse in London, that had come from the East Indies. "It is a parrakeet, equal to any I have seen for beauty; and I believe hath never been described or figured until now." In 1760 the French zoologist Mathurin Jacques Brisson included a description of the coconut lorikeet in his Ornithologie based on a specimen collected on the island of Ambon in Indonesia. He used the French name La perruche variée d'Amboine and the Latin name Psittaca amboinensis varia. Although Brisson coined Latin names, these do not conform to the binomial system and are not recognised by the International Commission on Zoological Nomenclature.

Assuming both previous authors as having written about the same species, Carl Linnaeus formally described the coconut lorikeet in 1771 as Psittacus haematodus. He had abbreviated the name to haematod. in print, to avoid it spilling over onto the next line. Misreading this, the shortened form "Trichoglossus haematod" was used historically by many authors. The specific epithet haematodus is from (h)aimatōdēs (Ancient Greek: αιματώδης), "blood-red".

In 1826, James Francis Stevens introduced the genus Trichoglossus, with the type species being given as "Trichoglossus hæmatopus", an erroneous name for the coconut lorikeet Stevens picked up from earlier authors. The genus name "Trichoglossus" is a blend of the Ancient Greek θρίξ (thrix, "hair") and γλῶσσα (glōssa, "tongue"). Hence the translation of its modern binomial name is "bloody hair-tongue". But while the lapsus "hæmatopus" was soon cleared up, throughout the 19th century, confusion reigned regarding the identification of the various similar Trichoglossus species of earlier authors and their collection localities. The coconut lorikeet was mixed up with the rainbow lorikeet (then usually known as T.cyanogaster or T.novaehollandiae) and usually called T.cyanogrammus, while the name T.haematodes was believed to refer to the marigold lorikeet, whose correct scientific name T.capistratus was by yet other authors mis-applied to the coconut lorikeet. In due time, this was eventually resolved.

For most of the 20th century, the species T.haematodes was broadly defined with almost two dozen subspecies recognised, and was known as the rainbow lorikeet. After mid-2010s phylogenetics studies, the common name now is restricted to the eastern Australian populations, classified as a distinct species Trichoglossus moluccanus. Also recognised as distinct species at that time were the sunset lorikeet (T. forsteni), leaf lorikeet (T. weberi), marigold lorikeet (T. capistratus), red-collared lorikeet (T. rubritorquis), and Biak lorikeet (T. rosenbergii).

=== Subspecies ===
Eight subspecies of this bird are tentatively recognised as of 2025 (but see below) and "coconut lorikeet" has been designated as the official common name for the species by the International Ornithologists' Union (IOU). Sorted into geographic groups, the subspecies are:

Image	Subspecies	Distribution and description
	T. h. haematodus (Linnaeus, 1771)	The nominate subspecies, it is found on Ambon, Buru, Seram, and the Tayandu Islands in the Moluccas, the Raja Ampat Islands, and most of the New Guinean mainland. There, it occurs in the lowlands of the entire west, as well as extending south of the central mountain range to the Fly River basin, and on the north coast up to the Ramu lowlands west of the Huon Peninsula. It is also found on Numfoor and Yapen islands in Cenderawasih Bay. Brightly colored overall, with a green belly and a dark red breast strongly barred dark blue. Birds in the northeastern part of the range tend to be larger and intensely-colored, and have been separated as subspecies intermedius, but variation seems to be clinal with typical haematodus and clearly distinct from Biak lorikeet which lives adjacent to both.
	T. h. micropteryx Stresemann, 1922	Eastern New Guinean lowlands, from east of the Fly River basin in the south, to the Huon Peninsula and the upper Ramu river between Bismarck and Finisterre Ranges. Intensely colored like its northwestern neighbor "intermedius", but distinctly smaller. Sometimes included in T.h.massena, due to similar size, but much darker with strong breast barring and probably closer related to T.h.haematodus.
	T. h. flavicans Cabanis & Reichenow, 1876	Admiralty Islands and Lavongai in the northwestern Bismarck Archipelago. Larger and generally paler than T.h.micropteryx, but head dark towards neck; chest with vestigial or no barring.
	T. h. nesophilus Neumann, 1929	Ninigo and possibly Hermit Islands in the Western Islands, Papua New Guinea. Like T.h.flavicans but even lighter in color, with strongly contrasting dark head and distinctly yellowish belly and thighs; breast light bright red and unbarred, similar to red-collared lorikeets. Possibly a very young (Holocene) population; distinctness from flavicans requires confirmation.
	T. h. massena Bonaparte, 1854 (Massena's lorikeet)	Islets along the northeastern coast of New Guinea, from the Eastern Schouten Islands to Woodlark and Budibudi Islands in the Milne Bay Islands; Bismarck Archipelago except in the northwest; Solomon Islands (including the Santa Cruz Islands but not Rennell and Belona) to Vanuatu. Similar to T.h.micropteryx in size, but closer to T.h.flavicans in coloration, with breast barring marginal.
	T. h. deplanchii J.Verreaux & Des Murs, 1860 (Deplanche's lorikeet)	Grande Terre (New Caledonia) and Ile des Pins in New Caledonia; introduced on Ouvéa in the Loyalty Islands. Resembles T.h.massena, but more subdued coloration, with a dull olive-grey hue except for the bright blue face.
	T. h. nigrogularis G.R.Gray, 1858	Kai Islands and Aru Islands in the southeasternmost Moluccas, south of western New Guinea. Large, belly blackish between green thighs, breast orange-red and with minimal barring; resembles a rainbow lorikeet of Australia, but markedly darker. Includes the former subspecies brooki; T.h.caeruleiceps was often included here too.
	T. h. caeruleiceps D'Albertis & Salvadori, 1879	Western Province (Papua New Guinea) south of the Fly River and Merauke Regency in Indonesia, barely reaches Australia in the northern Torres Strait Islands. Resembles T.h.nigrogularis, but lighter and even more similar to rainbow lorikeets in color; distinctly smaller size than its neighbors.

However, a 2017 preliminary phylogenetic study suggested a slightly different arrangement. In this mtDNA cytochrome b phylogeny, New Guinea is resolved the ancestral home of the "rainbow lorikeet" superspecies. The Biak lorikeet was found embedded in the coconut lorikeet clade, but taxon sampling was far from complete, with only half the entire "T. haematodus" complex covered, and a mere 3 of the 11 named taxa pertinent to T. haematodes in the strict sense (and the nominate subspecies – Brisson's original perruche variée d'Amboine – not among them). Even so, the Biak population's specific distinctness is nonetheless doubtful and the authors recommend its downranking to a coconut lorikeet subspecies T. h. rosenbergii. Its combination of breast, belly and neck pattern is unique among the entire "rainbow lorikeet" complex, but may be due to a founder effect. The dark-bellied southern taxa nigrogularis/brooki and caeruleiceps, meanwhile, appeared to be closer to the rainbow lorikeet. T.haematodus seems to have diverged into its subspecies fairly recently, in the Late Pleistocene and probably just about 20.000 years ago, possibly as rising sea levels at the end of the last ice age fragmented larger islands and isolated offshore populations of coconut lorikeets from the New Guinean mainland.

These results were clarified in subsequent more thorough molecular phylogenetic studies. The subspecies of T.haematodus seem to form three (perhaps four) distinct groups:

- The nominate group, occurring on the eastern Moluccas (except the Kai and Aru islands) and on mainland New Guinea, with a green belly and a barred chest. These subspecies – haematodus and micropteryx – would remain in T.haematodus in its most restricted definition.
- The massena group occurring from the Bismarck Archipelago to New Caledonia, and uniting the taxa with a light-green belly and strongly reduced brest barring. This group includes massena, nesophilus, deplanchii, and possibly the little-studied flavicans.
- The nigrogularis group of the Trans-Fly region and the islands between New Guinea and Australia (including Kei and Aru), with a blackish belly and reduced or no breast barring. These taxa – nigrogularis and the re-validated caeruleiceps – are only tentatively kept with T.haematodus; while they do not seem to be closer to the rainbow lorikeet as suggested by the initial restricted DNA study, they likewise stand apart from the previous two groups.
- Biak lorikeet, which might warrant inclusion within T.haematodus if the massena and nigrolaris groups are not split off. Its combination of a large yellow neck patch, an extensively dark blue belly, and a thickly barred beast patch, however, is strikingly distinct from the rest of the "rainbow lorikeet" complex but suggestive of Gloger's rule; also, its massive bill distinguishes it from its closest relatives and likewise suggests it occupies a distinct ecological niche. While its habitat does not notably differ from western New Guinean forests overall, it is notable that almost 10% of the local bird species are endemic to Biak and nearby islands, and absent from the New Guinean mainland.

However, even in the more comprehensive studies, the fairly recent radiation, uneven data quality, and suspicions of gene flow between somewhat distantly related but geographically adjacent taxa (caeruleiceps and haematodus), long-branch attraction (between the Biak lorikeet and the massena group) or incomplete lineage sorting (between flavicans and nigrogularis) obfuscate relationships; as of 2024, different analytical methods failed to yield a consistent and well-supported phylogeny of the coconut lories.

What has become quite clear though is that the "rainbow lorikeet" complex originated in the Torres Strait region, diverging from the ancestors of the Eastern Australian scaly-breasted lorikeet which lacks contrasting colors, instead being green with some yellow mottling all over. While this split as of 2024 cannot be precisely timed yet, it probably happened in the Pliocene, less than 5 and perhaps as little as 2 million years ago. The New Guinean population – the ancestral coconut lorikeets – then spread northwards throughout the lowlands, west into the Moluccas and east across Melanesia; by that time, it must already have evolved its characteristic "rainbow" coloration. Another early divergence from the New Guinean population spread back south towards Australia, losing the breast barring and evolving a dark belly patch; they were presumably well reproductively isolated from the scaly-breasted lorikeet due to their signal colors facilitating sexual selection. This population subsequently radiated across eastern and northern Australia, from there crossing the Timor Sea and settling the Lesser Sunda Islands; throughout this expansion, the other species of the "rainbow lorikeet" complex branched off one by one. Remarkably, these barely reach into the Moluccas east of Timor, but are separated from the coconut lorikeet by the Tanimbar Islands in the central Moluccas, where no member of the species complex ever seems to have occurred.

== Ecology and behavior ==
Feeding on bananas in Jurong Bird Park Singapore

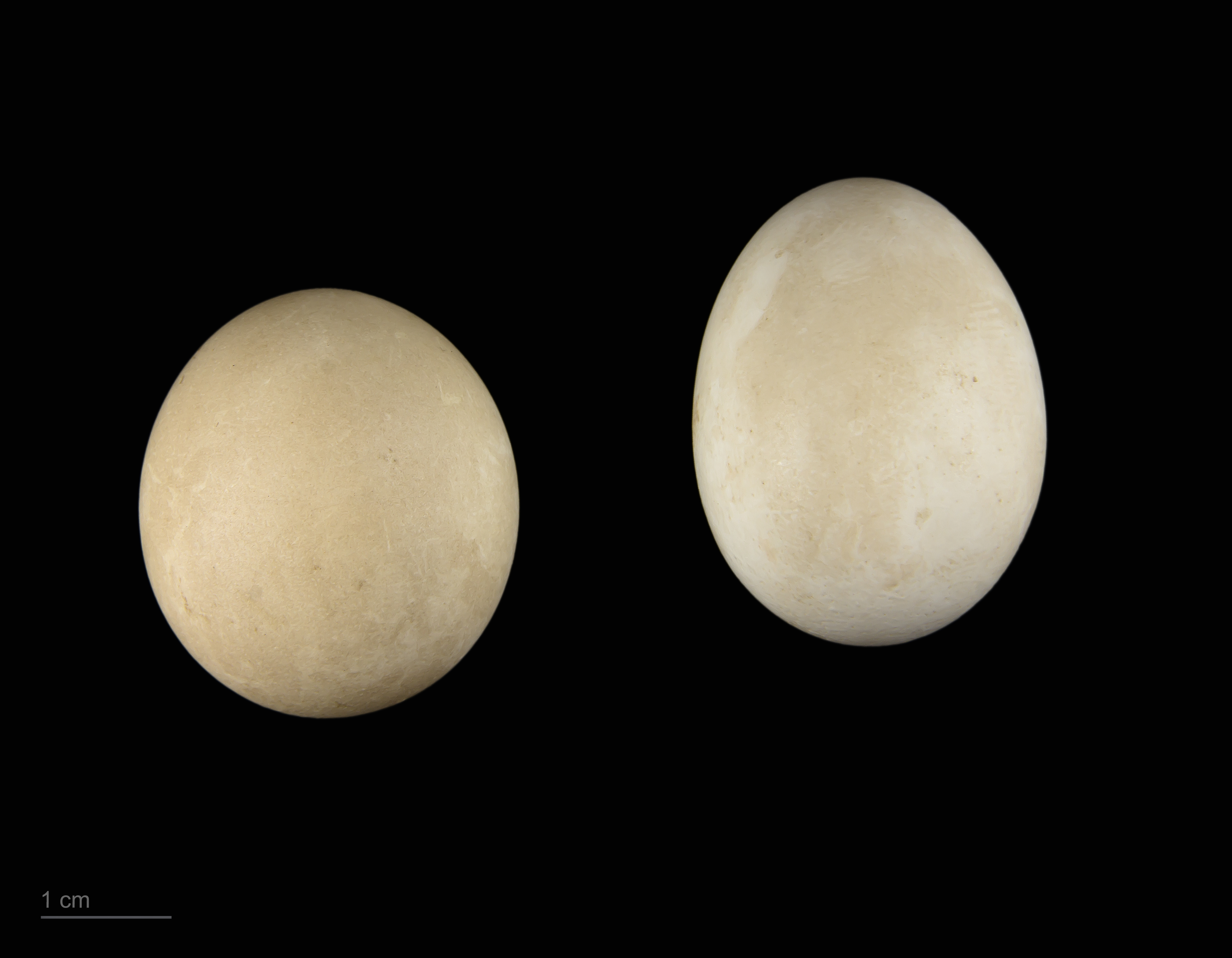
Eggs in MHNT collection showing variation in shape within one clutch

The species occupies a wide range of lowland and wooded hill habitats, including mangroves, rainforest, nypa forest, swamps, savanna and woodland. It also occupies human-modified areas including coconut plantations, gardens, agricultural land and disturbed forest. It is found from sea level up to as high as 2,440 m (8,010 ft); this upper altitude level varies by location.

These lorikeets have on the tip of their specialized tongue a small brush, which is actually the tongue's extended papillae. With the help of the tongue, they are able to feed on nectar and pollen from flowers. They mainly feed on nectar and pollen, but they also eat other parts of the flowers, as well as seeds, fruits, berries, insects, and larvae. They usually make a huge noise during flight, emitting screeching calls (e.g. "peaow-peaow-peaow"), at regular intervals.

Coconut lorikeets are monogamous birds, choosing only one partner for their whole life. They are diurnal birds living in very large bands. In the evening, they join their fellows in a dormitory tree. These birds may breed throughout most of year, depending on the region. Usually they breed in the spring, from July to December. They usually raise one brood a year, sometimes two.

Nests are usually located in holes in decaying wood, such as hollows of eucalyptus trees, at a height of 25 metres (82 ft) above the ground. Females lay two matte white, round eggs and incubate them for 23–25 days. Parents feed the chicks for 7–8 weeks, after which they leave the nest and after another 2–3 weeks they become completely independent.
