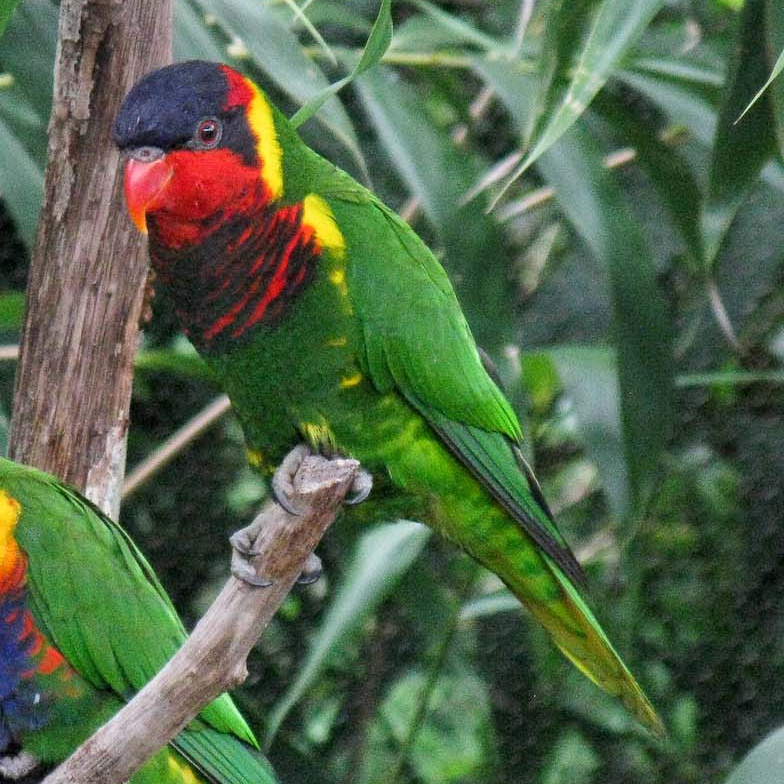
- At Nashville Zoo, USA

Conservation status
- Least Concern (IUCN 3.1)

Scientific classification
- Kingdom: Animalia
- Phylum: Chordata
- Class: Aves
- Order: Psittaciformes
- Family: Psittaculidae
- Genus: Trichoglossus
- Species: T. ornatus

Binomial name
- Trichoglossus ornatus (Linnaeus, 1758)

Synonyms
- Psittacus ornatus Linnaeus, 1758; Saudareos ornata

= Ornate lorikeet =

Species of bird

The ornate lorikeet (Trichoglossus ornatus), sometimes named the ornate lory, is a species of parrot in the family Psittaculidae. It is endemic to the Sulawesi archipelago in Indonesia. It is found in forest, woodland, mangrove and plantations, and is locally common.

== Taxonomy ==
The ornate lorikeet was formally described by the Swedish naturalist Carl Linnaeus in 1758 in the tenth edition of his Systema Naturae under the binomial name Psittacus ornatus. Linnaeus based his description of the "Lory Parrakeet" that had been described and illustrated in 1751 by George Edwards in his "A Natural History of Uncommon Birds". Linnaeus mistakenly specified the location as "America" although Edwards had stated that the bird had come from the "East Indies" (actually the Indonesian island of Sulawesi). The ornate lorikeet is now placed in the genus Trichoglossus that was introduced by the English naturalist James Francis Stephens in 1826.

== Description ==
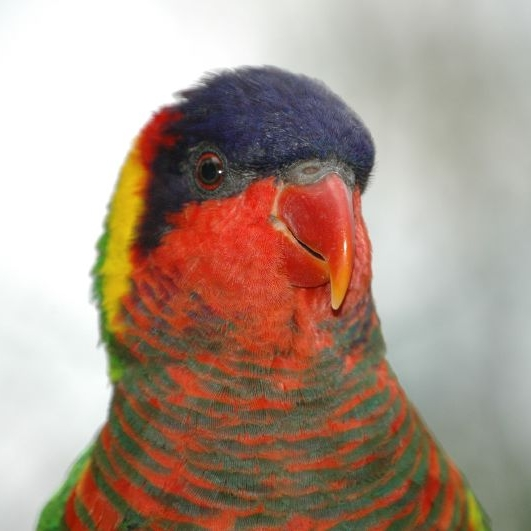
Head and neck

The ornate lorikeet is a mainly green parrot about 25 cm (10.0 in) long. Its head above its eyes is purple-blue and its face below its eyes is red. There is red at back of the head and yellow behind the eyes. It does not have a collar at the back of the neck that rainbow lorikeets have. Its chin to chest has transverse strips and bars of red and blue. Its abdomen is green with sparse variable yellow scalloping. The beak is orange-red, the irises are dark orange, the eye-ring is dark grey, and the legs are grey.

== Behavior ==
The ornate lorikeet usually gathers in pairs or in small flocks, though large flocks have been observed. It may sometimes form mixed flocks with the yellow and green lorikeet.
