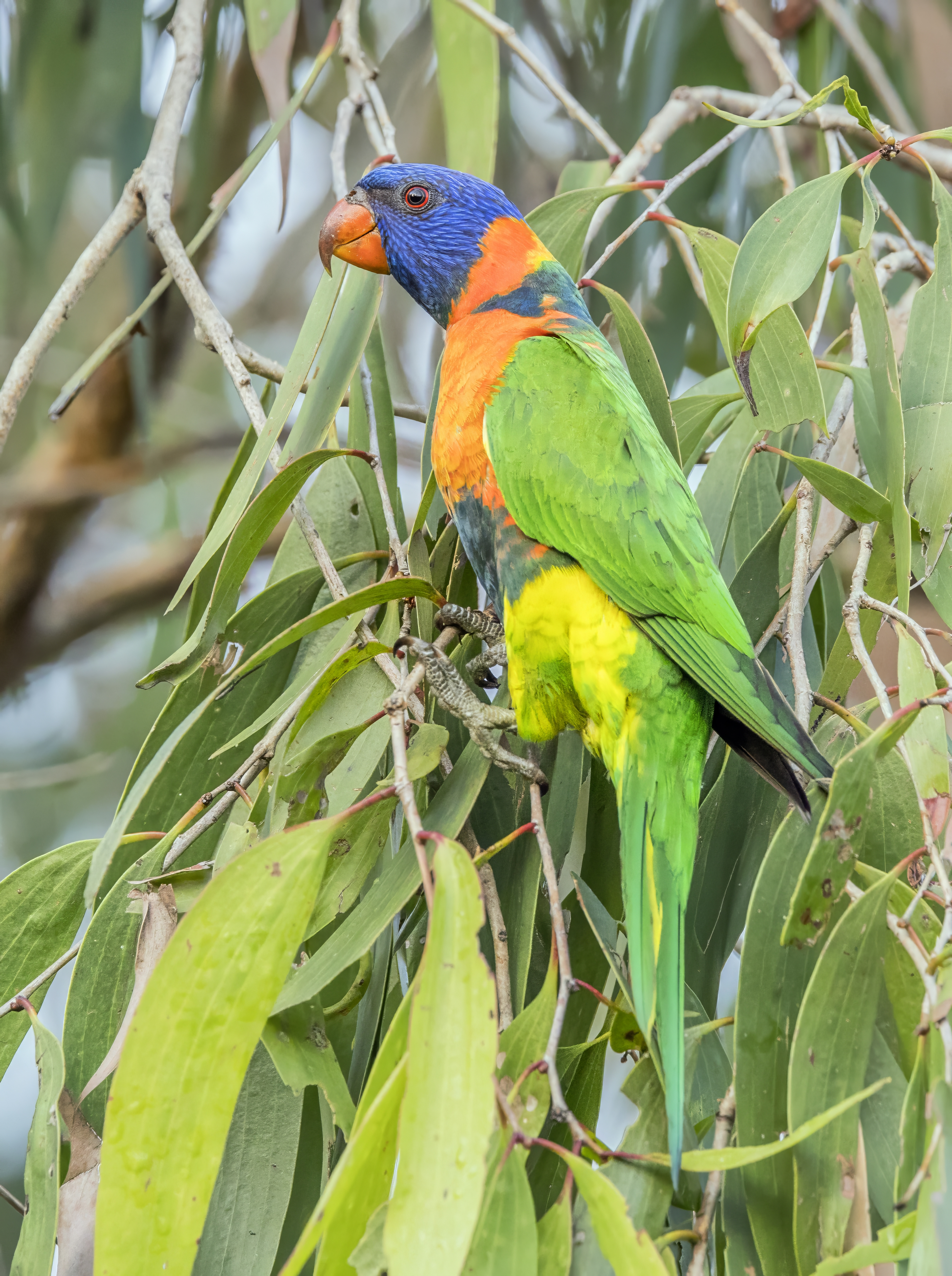
- George Brown Darwin Botanic Gardens, NT

Conservation status
- Least Concern (IUCN 3.1)

Scientific classification
- Kingdom: Animalia
- Phylum: Chordata
- Class: Aves
- Order: Psittaciformes
- Family: Psittaculidae
- Genus: Trichoglossus
- Species: T. rubritorquis

Binomial name
- Trichoglossus rubritorquis Vigors & Horsfield, 1827

Synonyms
- Trichoglossus rubritorquatus Finsch; Trichoglossus rubritorques Salvadori

= Red-collared lorikeet =

Species of bird

The red-collared lorikeet (Trichoglossus rubritorquis) is a species of parrot found in wooded habitats in northern Australia (north-eastern Western Australia, northern Northern Territory and far north-western Queensland). It was previously considered a subspecies of the rainbow lorikeet, but today most major authorities consider them as separate species. No other member of the rainbow lorikeet group has an orange-red collar over the nape.

Every year at the end of the dry season in Darwin, many of them display symptoms of apparent drunkenness. What causes this condition is unclear, though it is thought to be most likely due to a seasonal virus. Intoxication with fermented nectar has been ruled out.

== Taxonomy ==
Nicholas Aylward Vigors and Thomas Horsfield described the red-collared lorikeet in 1827. The species name is derived from the Latin words ruber "red" and torquis "neck".

Molecular analysis using mitochondrial cytochrome b showed the red-collared lorikeet is most closely related to a lineage that gave rise to the marigold lorikeet and sunset lorikeet of Indonesia. It is more distantly related to the rainbow lorikeet, the two distinct lineages colonising Australia independently.

No subspecies are recognised, and there is no regional variation.

"Red-collared lorikeet" has been designated as the official common name for the species by the International Ornithologists' Union (IOC). Other common names include orange-naped lorikeet and (incorrectly) blue bonnet.

== Description ==
The red-collared lorikeet measures around 26 centimetres (10 in) long. The feathers of the head and throat are dark brown with blue shafts. There is an orange-red band on the back of the neck. The chest is orange with red. The base of the hindneck is dark blue. The wings are green. The bill is red. The legs and feet are grey-brown. The sexes are similar in plumage while the juvenile has duller plumage and a dark bill.

The red-collared lorikeet is distinguished from the rainbow lorikeet by the latter's green rather than red nape, the lack of a blue mantle and more yellow-green underparts. The two may both occur where their ranges abut east of the Gulf of Carpentaria.

== Distribution and habitat ==
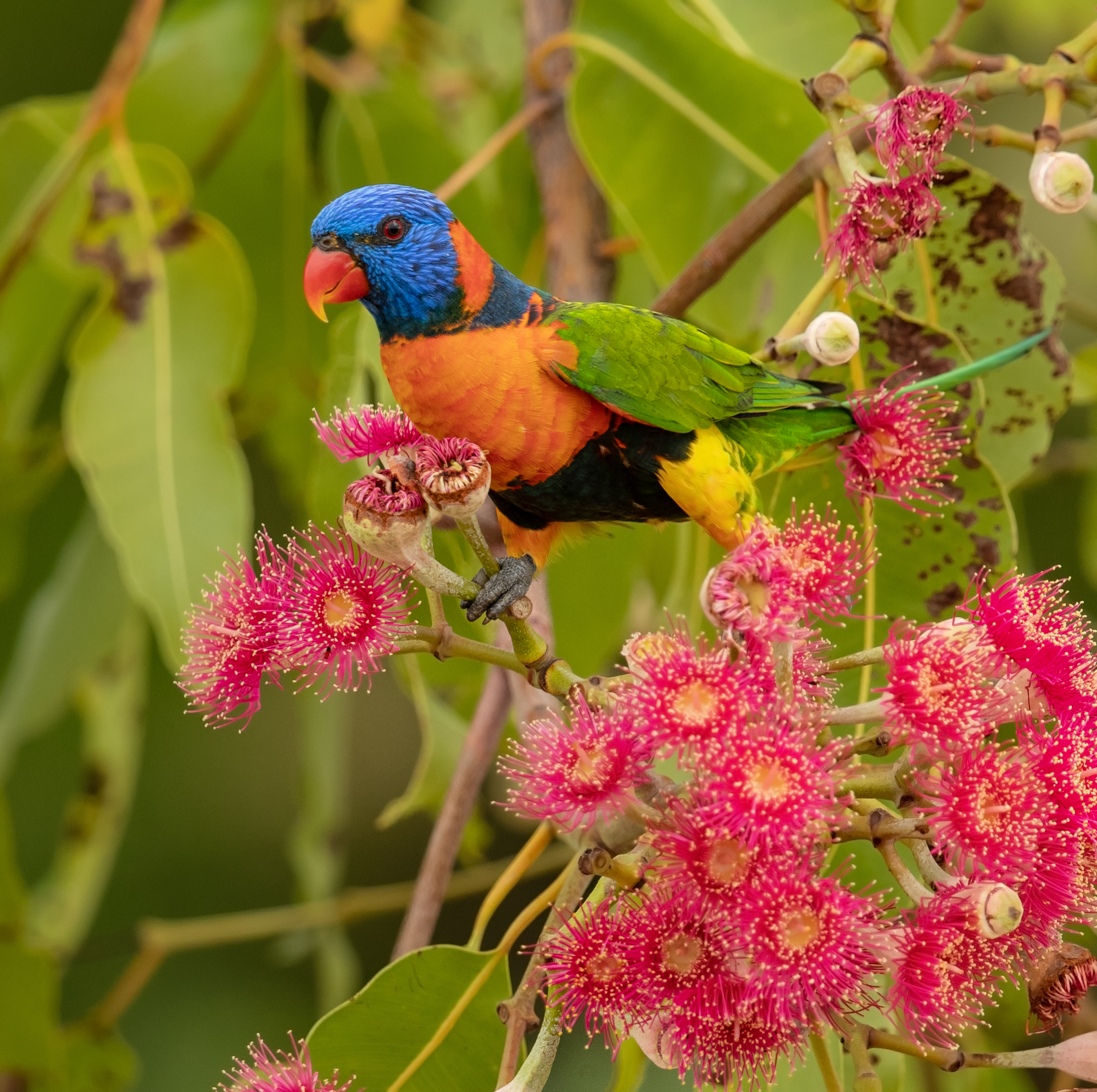

The red-collared lorikeet is found across northern Australia, from King Sound in Western Australia to the Gulf of Carpentaria. It lives in woodland, open forest and rainforest, and has adapted to urban environments readily, being found in towns and cities. The species is sedentary, though follows food supply, such as banksias in flower in April and May on Groote Eylandt.

== Breeding ==
The species nests throughout its range, in hollows in large trees, generally some distance above the ground. One or two broods are laid each year between August and January or March to June. The clutch consists of two matte white eggs, 23 millimetres (0.91 in) wide by 27 millimetres (1.1 in) long.

== Feeding ==
The red-collared lorikeet feeds on the flower heads of the Darwin woollybutt (Eucalyptus miniata). It sometimes feeds in the company of the varied lorikeet.
