= Yellow & Green =

Yellow & Green might refer to:

- Yellow & Green (Ron Carter album), 1976
- Yellow & Green (Baroness album), 2012
- Yellow-and-green lorikeet (citrine lorikeet or Trichoglossus flavoviridis), a parrot of Indonesia

== See also ==
- Yellow
- Green
