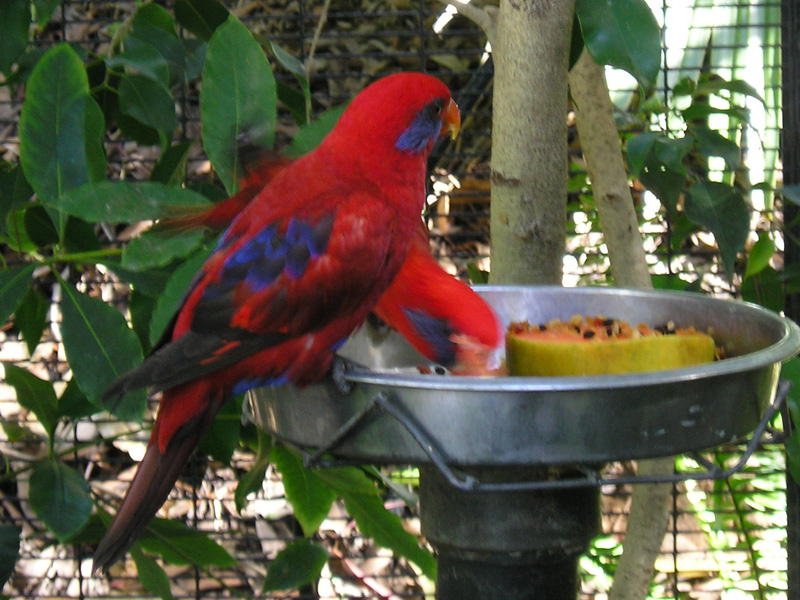
- Feeding at San Diego Zoo

Conservation status
- Near Threatened (IUCN 3.1)

Scientific classification
- Kingdom: Animalia
- Phylum: Chordata
- Class: Aves
- Order: Psittaciformes
- Family: Psittaculidae
- Genus: Trichoglossus
- Species: T. semilarvatus

Binomial name
- Trichoglossus semilarvatus (Bonaparte, 1850)

Synonyms
- Eos semilarvata

= Blue-eared lory =

Species of bird

The blue-eared lory (Trichoglossus semilarvatus) (also known as Ceram lory, half-masked lory or Seram lory) is a parrot found only on the island of Seram in Maluku province, Indonesia.

The blue-eared lory is only 24 cm in overall length. It has a red body with blue cheeks, chin, and ear-coverts, purple-blue abdomen and undertail coverts, and black streaked wings. The adult has an orange beak with juvenile's pink.

The blue-eared lory is sometimes found in the altitude as low as 800 m, but primarily from 1600–2400 m. It feeds on flowering trees, including tree-heathers above the tree-line. The flocks are small.

A common species in its limited range, the blue-eared lory is evaluated as Near Threatened on the IUCN Red List of Threatened Species. Its population is decreasing, and has been since at least 2019.
