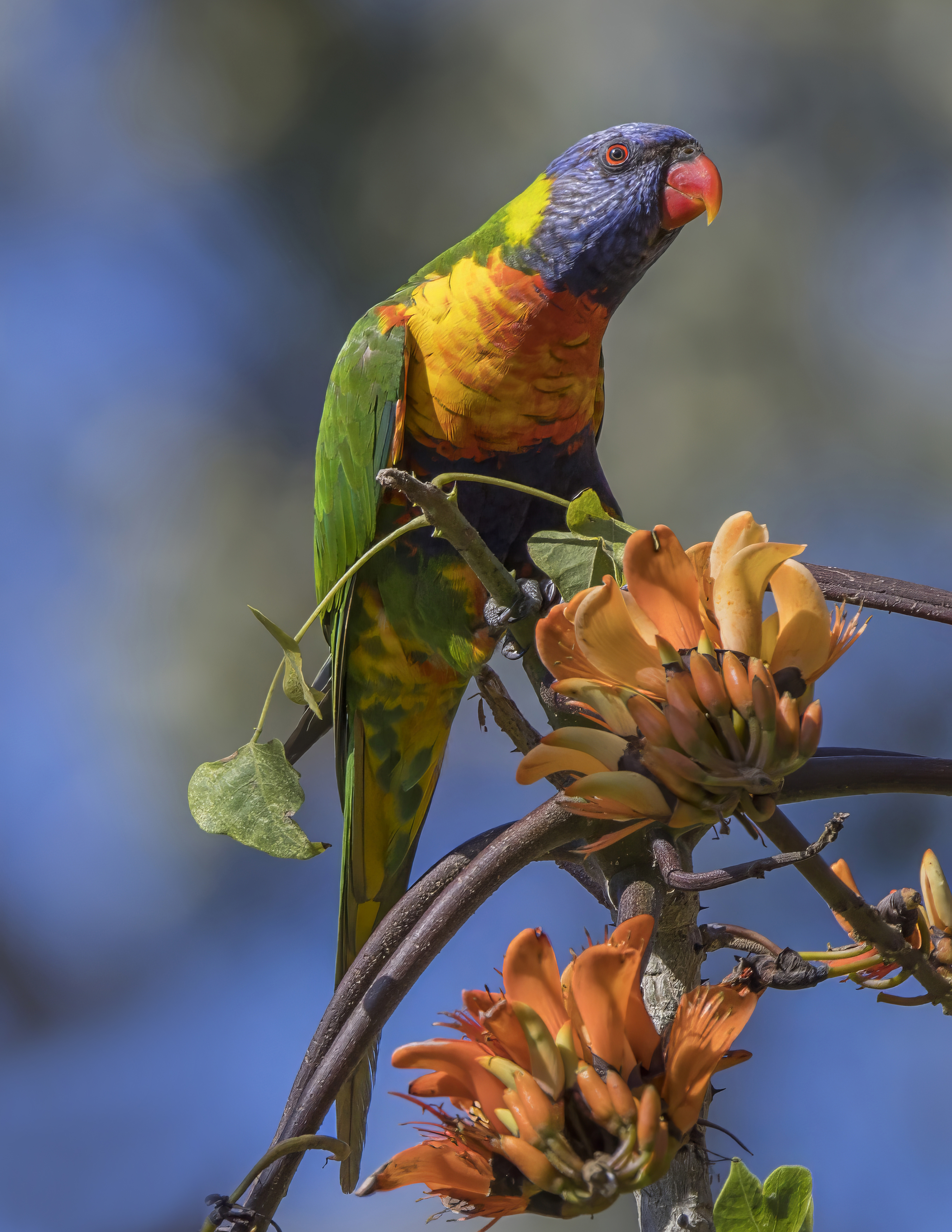
- Rainbow lorikeet (T. moluccanus)

Scientific classification
- Kingdom: Animalia
- Phylum: Chordata
- Class: Aves
- Order: Psittaciformes
- Family: Psittaculidae
- Tribe: Loriini
- Genus: Trichoglossus; Stephens, 1826

Type species
- Psittacus haematodus coconut lorikeet Linnaeus, 1771

Synonyms
- Eos Wagler, 1832; Saudareos Joseph et al, 2020; Glossopsitta Bonaparte, 1854

= Trichoglossus =

Genus of birds

Trichoglossus is a genus of lorikeet in the Psittaculidae family, part of the true parrot superfamily. The genus is distributed widely through Australia, Wallacea and Melanesia, with outliers in the Philippines and Micronesia. Members of the genus are characterised by barring, sometimes prominently, on the upper breast.

== Taxonomy ==
The genus Trichoglossus was introduced in 1826 by the English naturalist James Francis Stephens. The name combines the Ancient Greek thrix meaning "hair" and glōssa meaning "tongue". The type species was subsequently designated as the coconut lorikeet.

=== Species ===
The genus contains 22 species:

Image	Common name	Scientific name	Distribution
	Musk lorikeet	Trichoglossus concinnus	central east, southeast Australia
	Mindanao lorikeet	Trichoglossus johnstoniae	montane forest of Mindanao (southern Philippines)
	Iris lorikeet	Trichoglossus iris	Wetar and Timor (east Lesser Sunda Islands)
	Ornate lorikeet	Trichoglossus ornatus	Sulawesi and larger satellite islands
	Yellow-cheeked lorikeet	Trichoglossus meyeri	montane forest of Sulawesi
	Sula lorikeet	Trichoglossus flavoviridis	Sula Islands (Taliabu, Seho, and Mangole)
	Blue-streaked lory	Trichoglossus reticulatus	Tanimbar Islands (Arafura Sea)
	Blue-eared lory	Trichoglossus semilarvatus	montane forest of Seram (southern Moluccas)
	Red lory	Trichoglossus borneus	montane Seram (central east Moluccas)
	Black-winged lory	Trichoglossus cyanogenius	islands in Cenderawasih Bay (off northwestern New Guinea)
	Red-and-blue lory	Trichoglossus histrio	Sangihe Islands (formerly) and Talaud (north of Sulawesi)
	Violet-necked lory	Trichoglossus squamatus	north Moluccas and small islets of Raja Ampat Islands (northwest of New Guinea)
	Pohnpei lorikeet	Trichoglossus rubiginosus	lowlands of Pohnpei (eastern Caroline Islands)
	Scaly-breasted lorikeet	Trichoglossus chlorolepidotus	eastern Australia (Cape York Peninsula, southern Queensland, southward to southern New South Wales coast; introduced Perth, Melbourne, Canberra)
	Coconut lorikeet	Trichoglossus haematodus	central, south Moluccas, west New Guinea, east to Bismarck Archipelago, Solomon Islands, Vanuatu and New Caledonia
	Biak lorikeet	Trichoglossus rosenbergii	Biak (Cenderawasih Bay, off northwestern New Guinea)
	Rainbow lorikeet	Trichoglossus moluccanus	east, southeast Australia and Tasmania
	Red-collared lorikeet	Trichoglossus rubritorquis	northwestern Australia (Kimberley region, northern Western Australia, eastward to northwestern Queensland)
	Olive-headed lorikeet	Trichoglossus euteles	Lesser Sunda Islands (Timor and adjacent islands from Lomblen to Babar Islands)
	Marigold lorikeet	Trichoglossus capistratus	central, east Lesser Sunda Islands
	Leaf lorikeet	Trichoglossus weberi	Flores (Lesser Sunda Islands)
	Sunset lorikeet	Trichoglossus forsteni	Bali, west Lesser Sunda Islands and (at least formerly) Flores Sea islands south of Sulawesi
