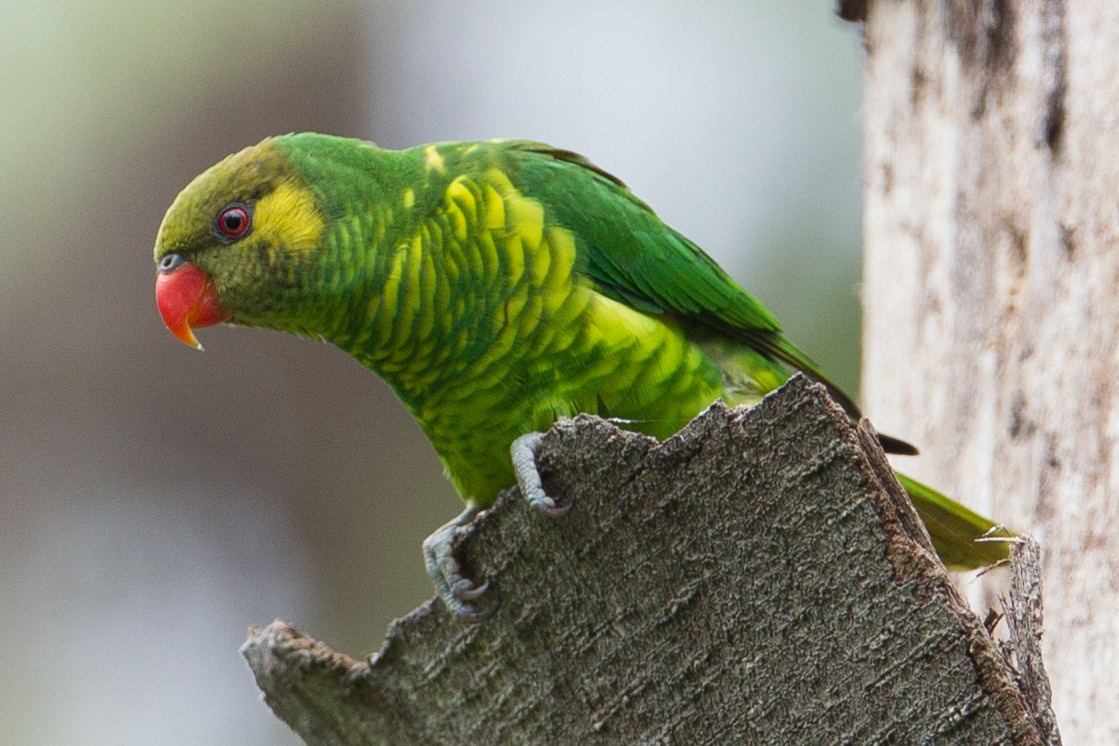

Conservation status
- Least Concern (IUCN 3.1)

Scientific classification
- Kingdom: Animalia
- Phylum: Chordata
- Class: Aves
- Order: Psittaciformes
- Family: Psittaculidae
- Genus: Trichoglossus
- Species: T. meyeri

Binomial name
- Trichoglossus meyeri Walden, 1871

Synonyms
- Saudareos meyeri

= Yellow-cheeked lorikeet =

Species of bird

The yellow-cheeked lorikeet (Trichoglossus meyeri) is a species of parrot in the family Psittaculidae. It is endemic to Sulawesi in Indonesia. It is generally common.

It was formerly considered conspecific with the Sula lorikeet and collectively called the citrine lorikeet.
