= Citrine lorikeet =

Citrine lorikeet has been split into the following species:

- Sula lorikeet, Saudareos flavoviridis
- Yellow-cheeked lorikeet, Saudareos meyeri
