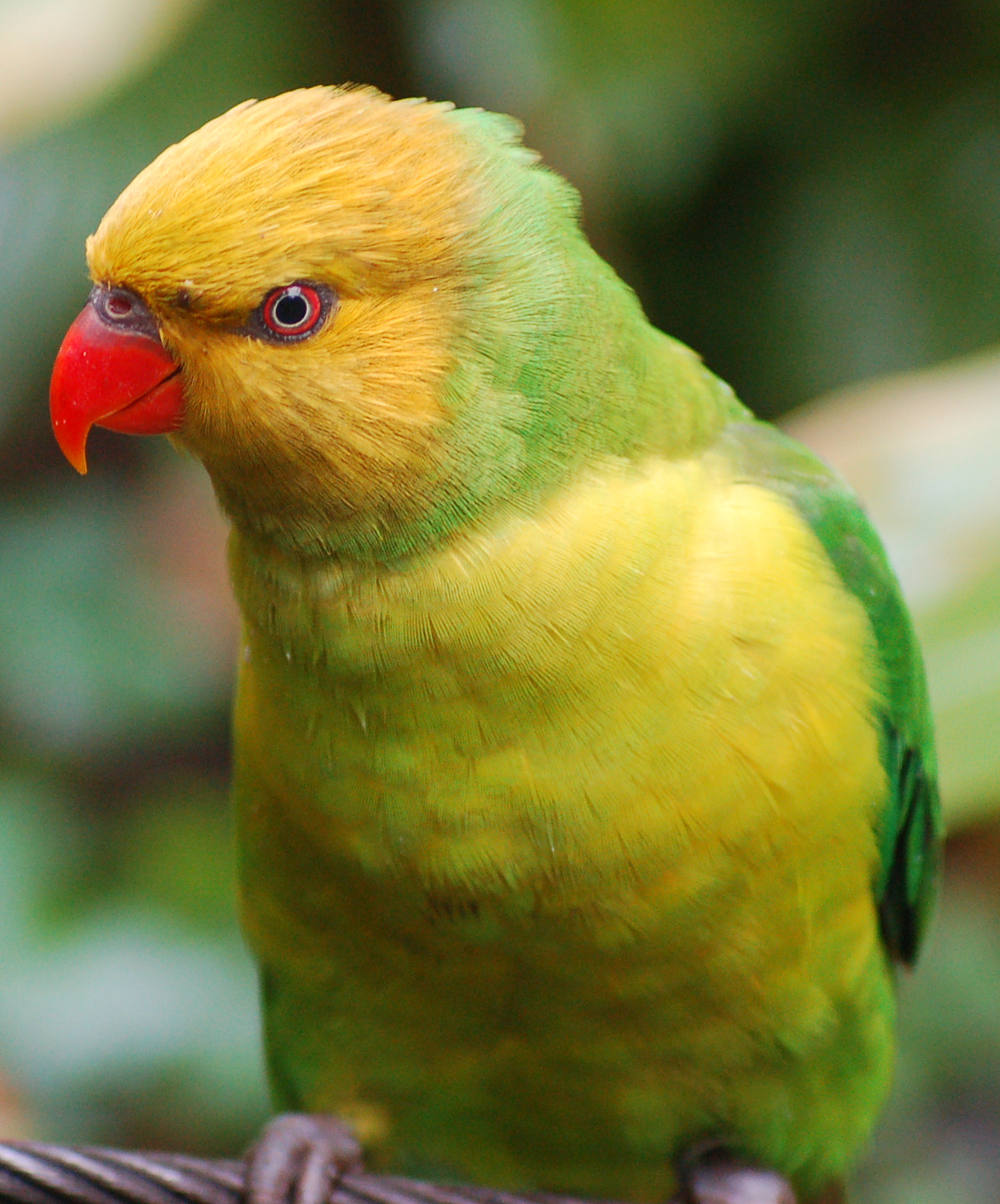

Conservation status
- Least Concern (IUCN 3.1)

Scientific classification
- Kingdom: Animalia
- Phylum: Chordata
- Class: Aves
- Order: Psittaciformes
- Family: Psittaculidae
- Genus: Trichoglossus
- Species: T. euteles

Binomial name
- Trichoglossus euteles (Temminck, 1835)

= Olive-headed lorikeet =

Species of bird

The olive-headed lorikeet (Trichoglossus euteles), also called the perfect lorikeet, is a species of parrot in the family Psittaculidae. It is found in forest, woodland and cultivated areas on Timor and smaller nearby islands.

== Description ==
The olive-headed lorikeet is a mainly green parrot about 24 cm (9.5 in) long. It has an olive coloured head which is demarcated by a green collar. Its beak is orange-red, its irises are red, and its legs are grey. The male and female have an identical external appearance. Juveniles have a slightly greener head, a brown beak, and brown irises.

== Taxonomy ==
The taxonomic name of the olive-headed lorikeet is Trichoglossus euteles (Temminck, 1835). They are part of the genus of lorikeet Trichoglossus. They also belong in the subfamily Loriinae of the family Psittaculidae.

== Habitat and Distribution ==
Adonara and Lembata are medium to large volcanic islands located off the eastern tip of Flores, in East Nusa Tenggara (Lesser Sundas), Indonesia. The olive-headed lorikeet is endemic to the Lesser Sundas therefore they have a restricted range. It prefers to live in rainforests and closed canopy forests. Their habitat are primary montane forest, secondary growth and savanna woodland at roughly 1000–2300 m.

== Behaviour ==
Lorikeets are extremely aggressive toward individuals of their own species as well as those of other species, both in the wild and in captivity. This aggression is most evident when it comes to food, perches, and nest sites. The olive-headed lorikeet performs elaborate ranges of visual threat displays during hostile interactions, like other parrots of the genus Trichoglossus.

=== Vocalizations ===
It is said that calls are repetitive, long and wheezy; also rapid, buzzy trilling notes and muted series of harsh, longer squeaks, twitters and whistles. They primarily produce sharp, high-pitched sounds expressed as "kreet!" or "kurrk," but also emits a softer, lisping "tsleet!" along with various muted, grating tones.

=== Diet ===
In captivity, at least forty percent of the diet should consist of either commercial or homemade nectar, which can be made from lactose-free baby cereal, honey, malt extract, or molasses, mixed with filtered water and made fresh once or twice a day. Other fruit and vegetable options include carrots, fresh corn on the cob, frozen sweetcorn, Swiss chard, lettuce, dandelion, sowthistle, and chickweed, dried figs soaked in water for a few hours, spray millet, a small amount of soaked or sprouted sunflower seed, and/or oats. In the wild, they feed on pollen, nectar, fruits, seeds and insects and their larvae.

=== Reproduction ===
There is no information from the wild. In captivity: three eggs, size 24·5–25·3 mm × 22·5–23 mm; incubation period 23 days. When it was sold, a Rainbow Lorikeet (Trichoglossus haematodus moluccanus) was said to be 32 years old and still reproducing, but no further information was available on the bird. The breeding season of the olive-headed lorikeet starts from November until February.

== Aviculture ==
Like the rainbow lorikeet, this species of lorikeet is popular in aviculture. It is present on the 2007 inventory of non-native (exotic) bird species known to be in Australia.

== Gallery ==
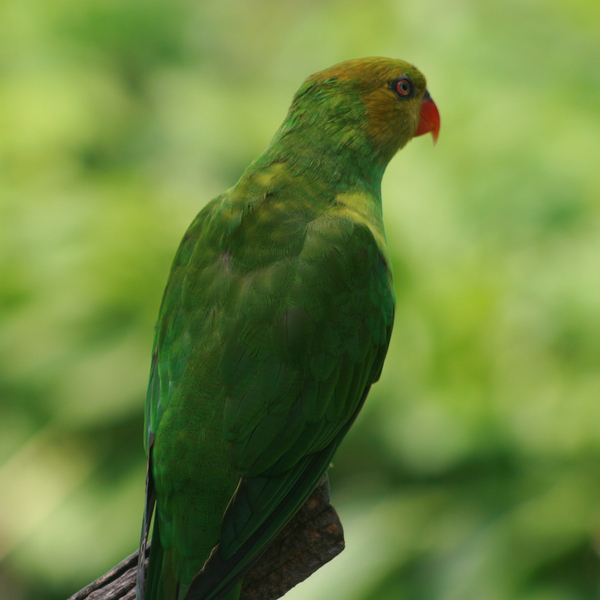
Back

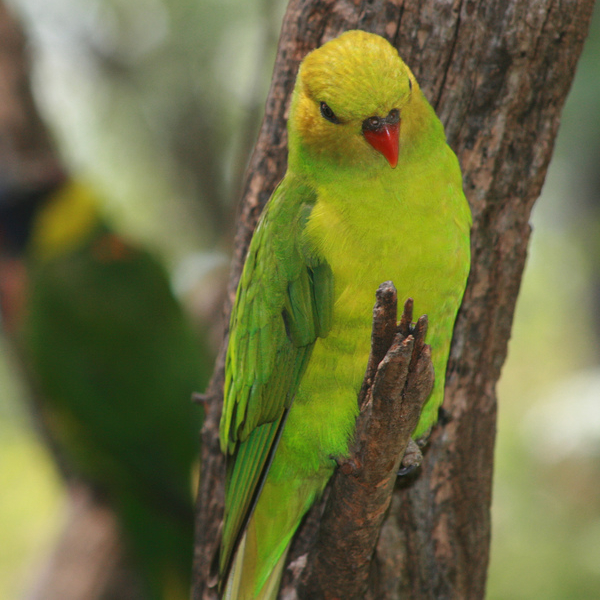
Front

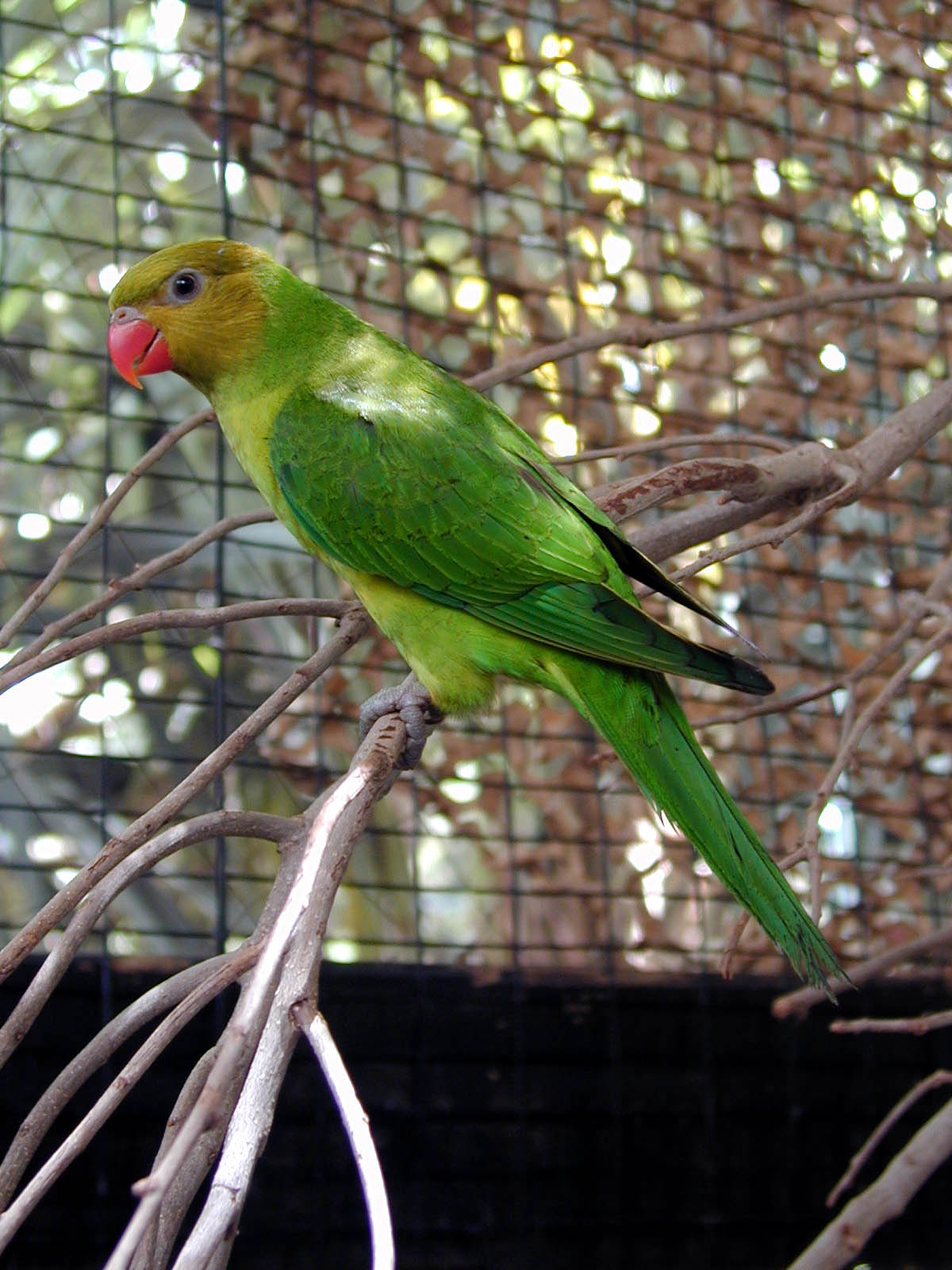
Side
