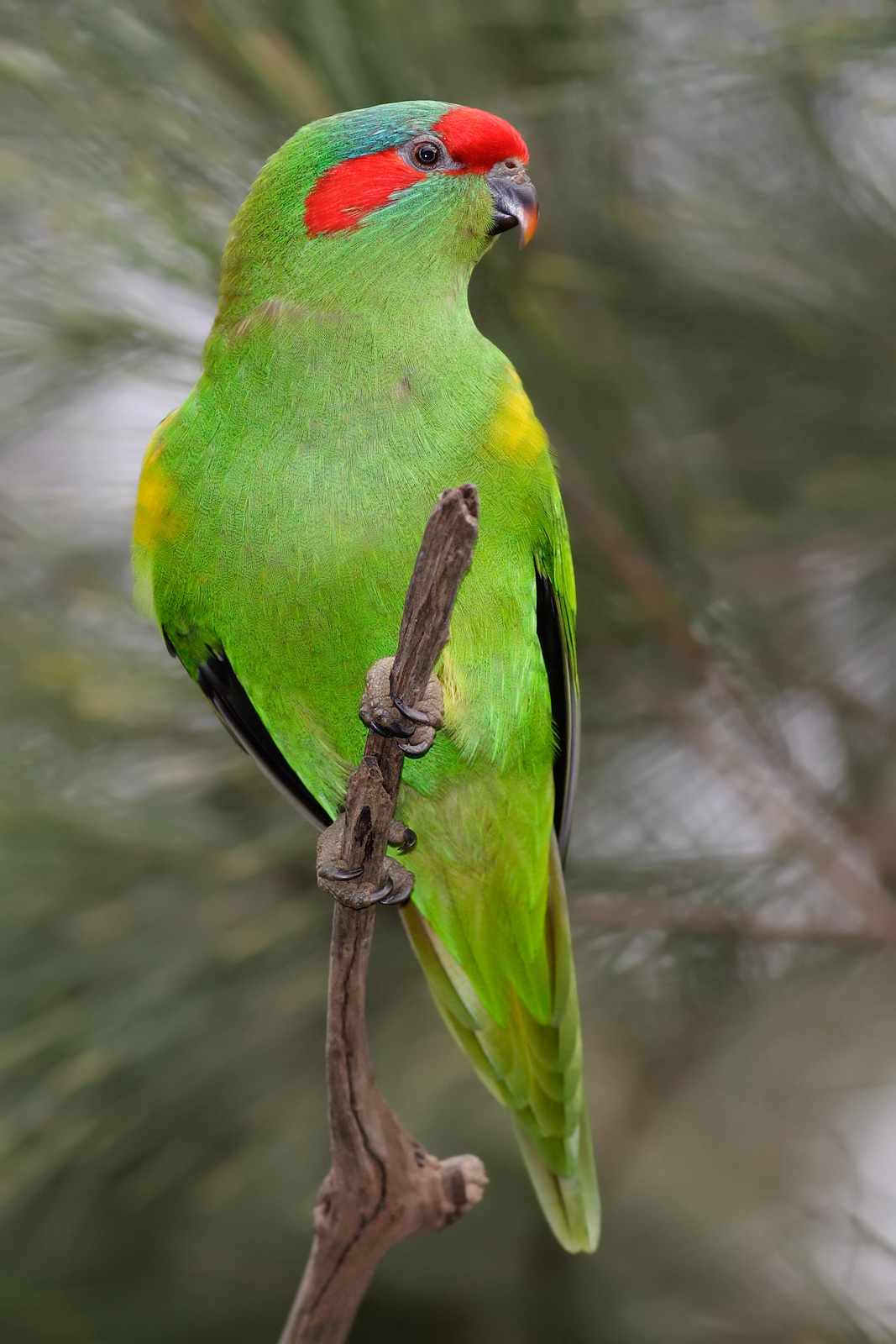

Conservation status
- Least Concern (IUCN 3.1)

Scientific classification
- Kingdom: Animalia
- Phylum: Chordata
- Class: Aves
- Order: Psittaciformes
- Family: Psittaculidae
- Genus: Trichoglossus
- Species: T. concinnus

Binomial name
- Trichoglossus concinnus (Shaw, 1791)
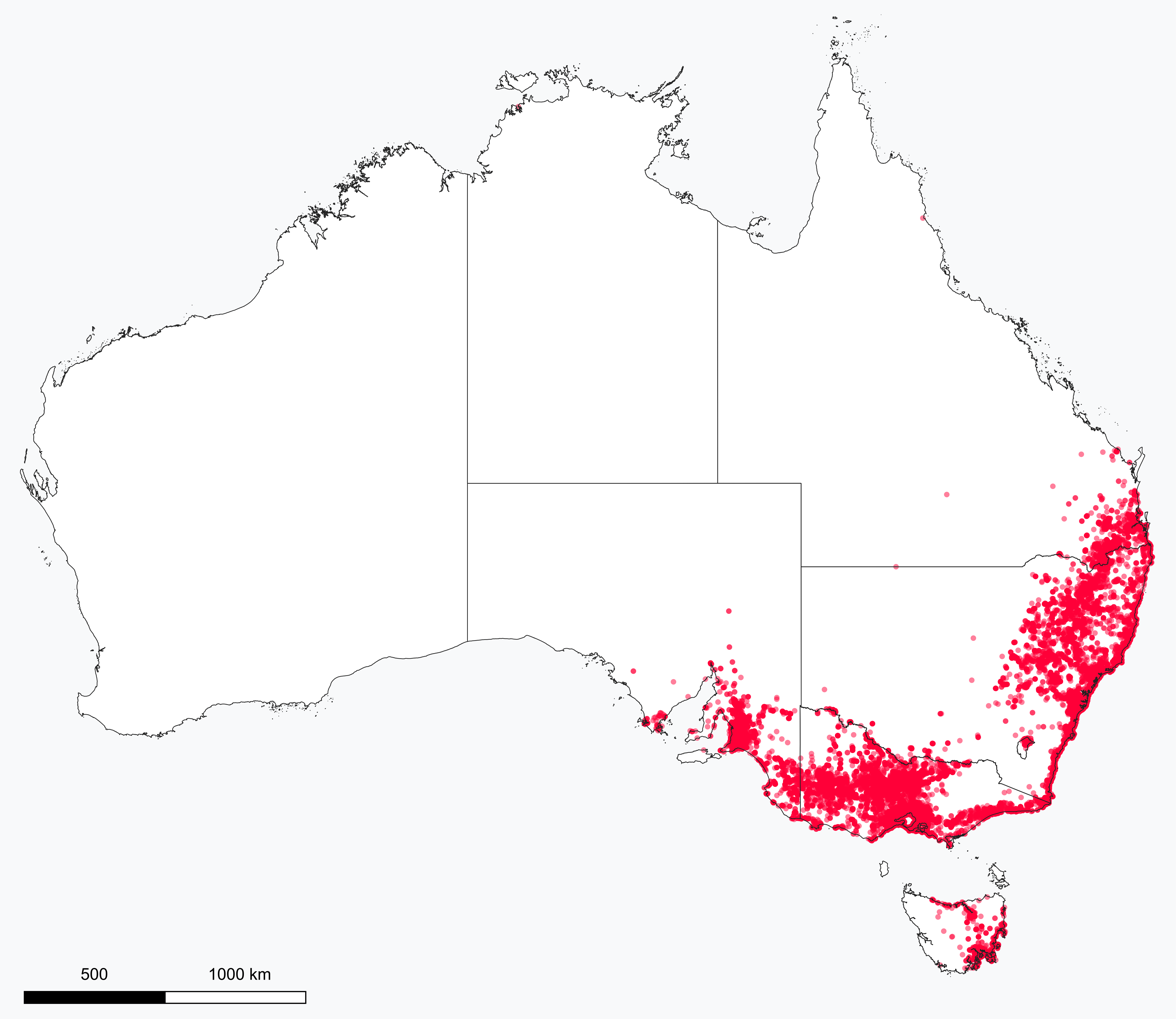
- Species distribution

Synonyms
- Glossopsitta concinna

= Musk lorikeet =

Species of bird

The musk lorikeet (Trichoglossus concinnus) is a species of bird in the parrot family Psittaculidae. It inhabits south-central/eastern Australia.

== Taxonomy ==
The musk lorikeet was first described and illustrated by the English naturalist George Shaw in 1791 as Psittacus concinnus. The specimen had been collected in New Holland, now New South Wales. The musk lorikeet is now placed in the genus Trichoglossus that was introduced by the English naturalist James Francis Stephens in 1826. Its specific epithet is the Latin concinna "elegant". Other common names include red-eared lorikeet, and green keet, and formerly a local Sydney indigenous term coolich. The names green leek and king parrot have been incorrectly applied to this species in the past.

== Description ==
The musk lorikeet is 22 centimetres (8.7 in) long. It is mainly green and it is identified by its red forehead, blue crown and a distinctive yellow band on its wing. Both upper and lower mandibles of the beak are red at the tip and darker near its base.

== Distribution and habitat ==
Musk lorikeets are found in eastern New South Wales, Victoria, South Australia and Tasmania. They are an uncommon nomad in woodlands and drier forests in south-east mainland, mainly west of Great Dividing Range, and in Tasmania. Musk lorikeets have been sighted and are recent common visitors to fruit trees in the Punchbowl Area, near Launceston, Northern Tasmania. Favourite foods seem to include apricots, apples, bottlebrush flowers & nectar, as well as seeds and nectar from Grevillea spp.

== Urban influence ==
Musk lorikeets are one of the few animals with the plasticity to survive and thrive in rapid urbanization. Over the past 30 years, flocks of musk lorikeets have been adopting Australia's cities, such as Melbourne and Sydney.

The partial reason for musk lorikeets' move to, and success in, urban areas is the planting of various nectar-producing plants throughout the city. They have evolved to consume nectar as a part of their major food source and can be found foraging in the blooming canopies of eucalyptus forests.

Unlike their natural habitat, the city plants are regularly maintained and so they have become a more reliable food source. Because the nectar plants tend to be most dense in the outer urban areas, most of the population prefers the outer urban areas, which allows for more feeding and roosting opportunities, rather than the inner ones. Although, there have been sightings of these lorikeets in the inner city regions but in reduced numbers; most likely from reduced vegetation.

The only Australian nectarivore to not have a preference between the inner city and outer urban zones is the rainbow lorikeet. Both the rainbow lorikeet and the musk lorikeet are nectarivores, which means that their niches overlap and that they must compete against one another for the limited amount of resources available. The growth and resources of the rainbow lorikeet population may limit the growth of the musk lorikeet population, and coupled with the growing urbanization, the musk lorikeet may have more competitive pressures for resources.

== Breeding ==
The musk lorikeet breeds mainly from August to January. The nest is usually built in a hollow limb high in a tree. Two white 24 mm × 20 mm (0.94 in × 0.79 in) eggs are laid and incubated for 22 days by the female. The young are fledged after 5 to 6 weeks.

== Gallery ==
Video: Cunninghams Gap, Queensland

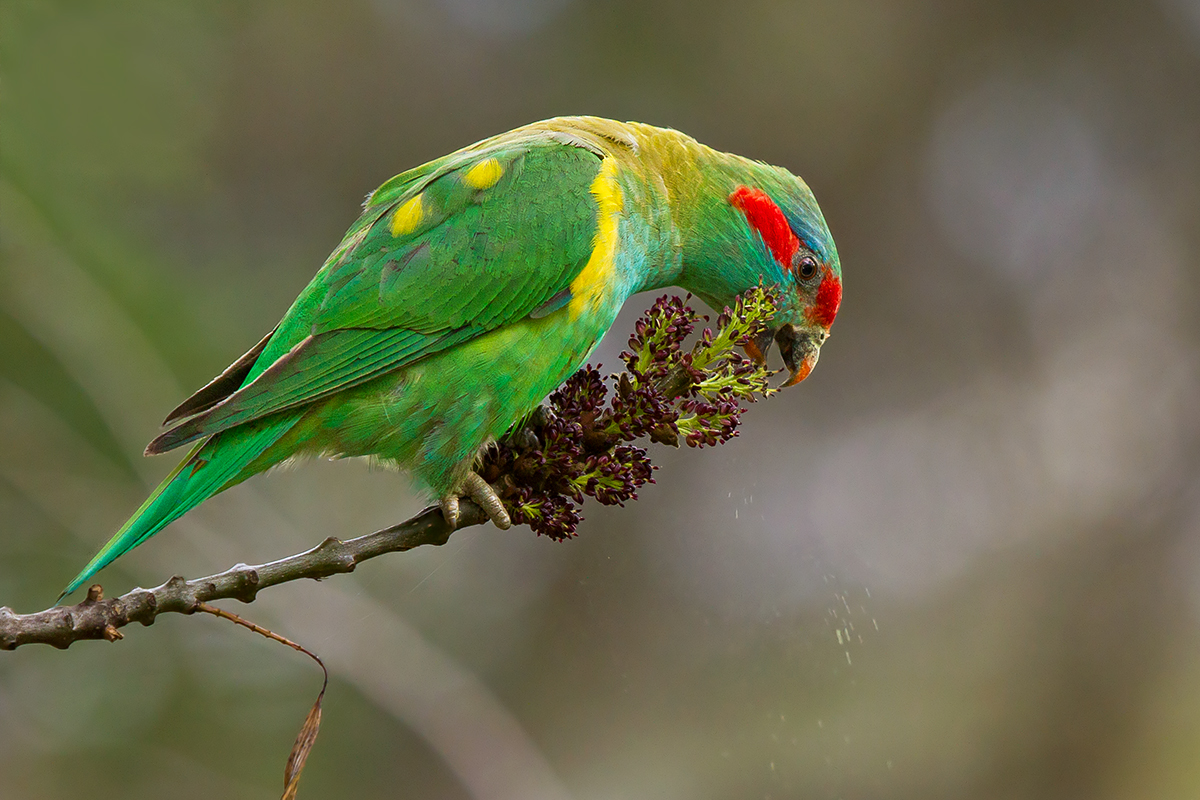
Feeding on a desert ash in Bendigo.

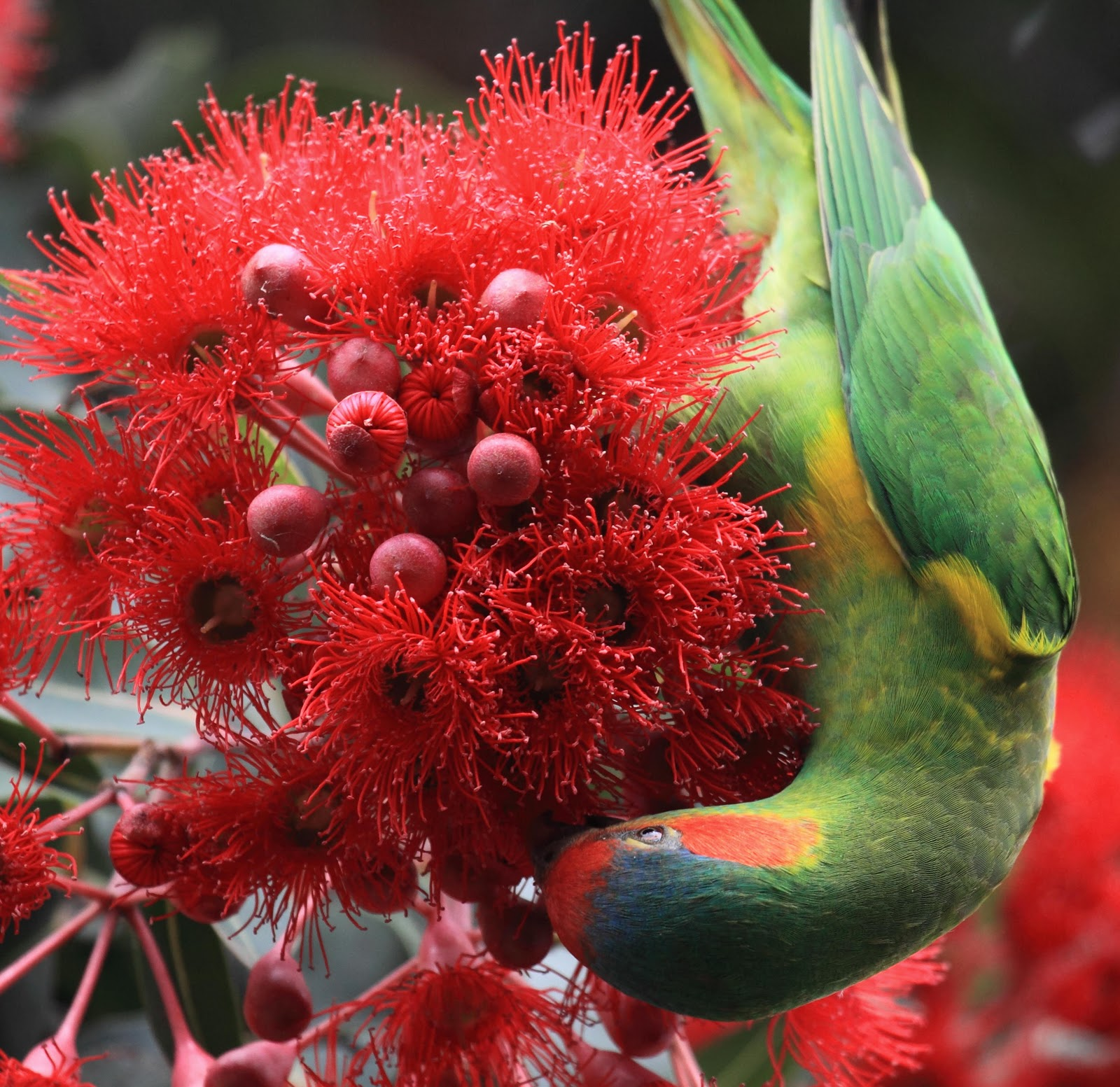
Feeding on a flowering gum in a park in Cheltenham, Victoria
