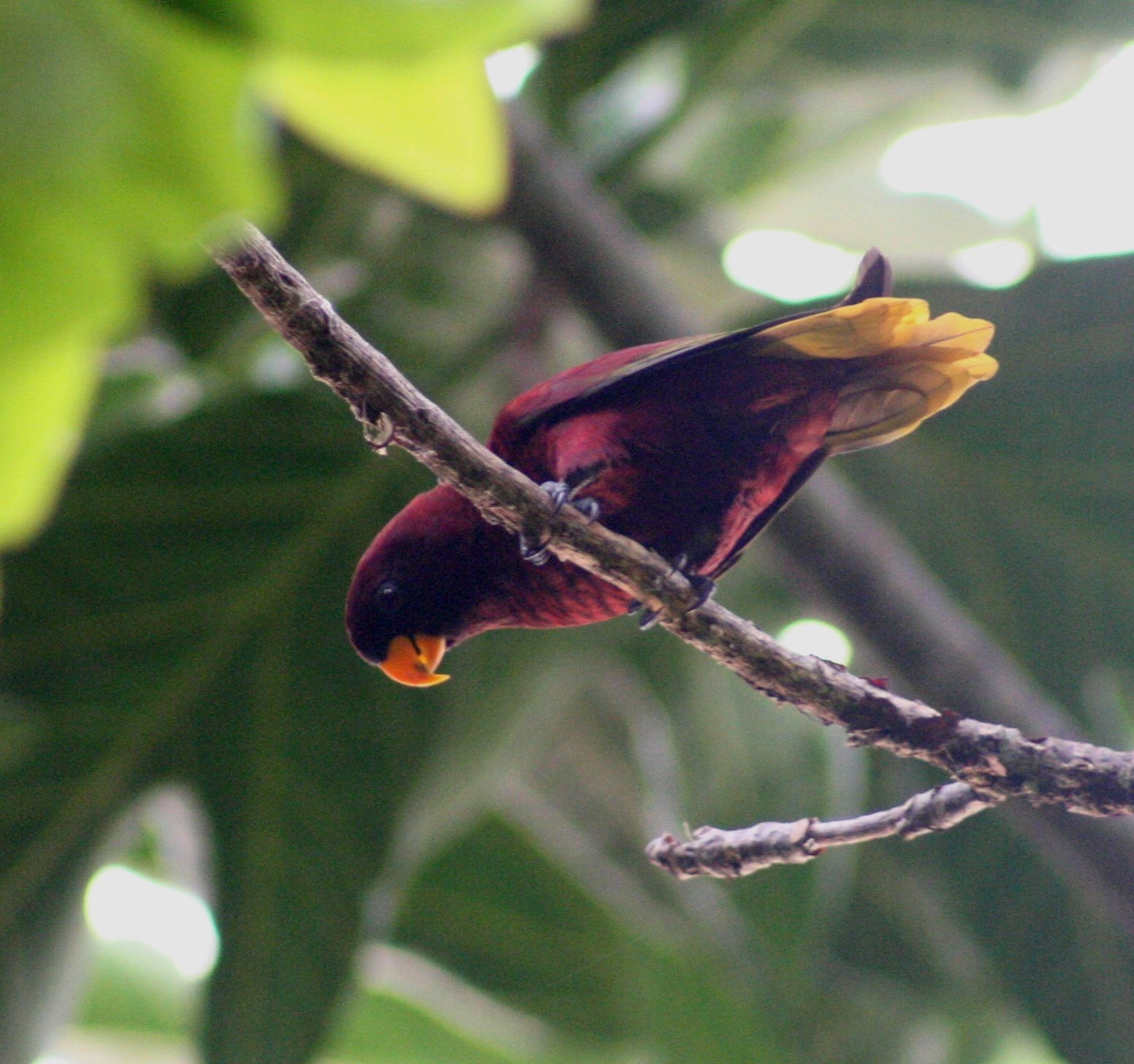
- In Pohnpei, Micronesia

Conservation status
- Near Threatened (IUCN 3.1)

Scientific classification
- Kingdom: Animalia
- Phylum: Chordata
- Class: Aves
- Order: Psittaciformes
- Family: Psittaculidae
- Genus: Trichoglossus
- Species: T. rubiginosus

Binomial name
- Trichoglossus rubiginosus (Bonaparte, 1850)

= Pohnpei lorikeet =

Species of bird

The Pohnpei lorikeet (Trichoglossus rubiginosus), known as serehd in Pohnpeian, is a species of parrot in the family Psittaculidae. It is endemic to the island of Pohnpei and the nearby Ant Atoll in Micronesia. Historically the species also occurred on Namoluk Atoll near Chuuk, and the species may once have had a wider distribution throughout Micronesia than it does today.

== Description ==
The Pohnpei lorikeet is 24 cm (9.4 in) long and weights around 80 g (2.8 oz). Its plumage is mainly reddish-maroon with vague approximately transverse striations of darker maroon. The head a slightly darker maroon. The flight feathers and tail are olive-yellow. Its legs are grey. The male has an orange beak and yellow-orange irises, while the female has a yellow beak and light grey irises. The juveniles have brown beaks and brown irises.

== Habitat and behaviour ==
Its natural habitat is tropical moist lowland forests and plantations. The diet is composed of nectar and pollen from coconuts and also fruit and insect larvae. It nests in a hole in a tree, laying a single egg. The species is common and not considered threatened.

== In human culture ==
The "Designation of State Bird Act" established the Pohnpei lorikeet as the state bird of Pohnpei, and simultaneously protected the bird from being hunted or killed; those disobeying the law can be fined or imprisoned.
