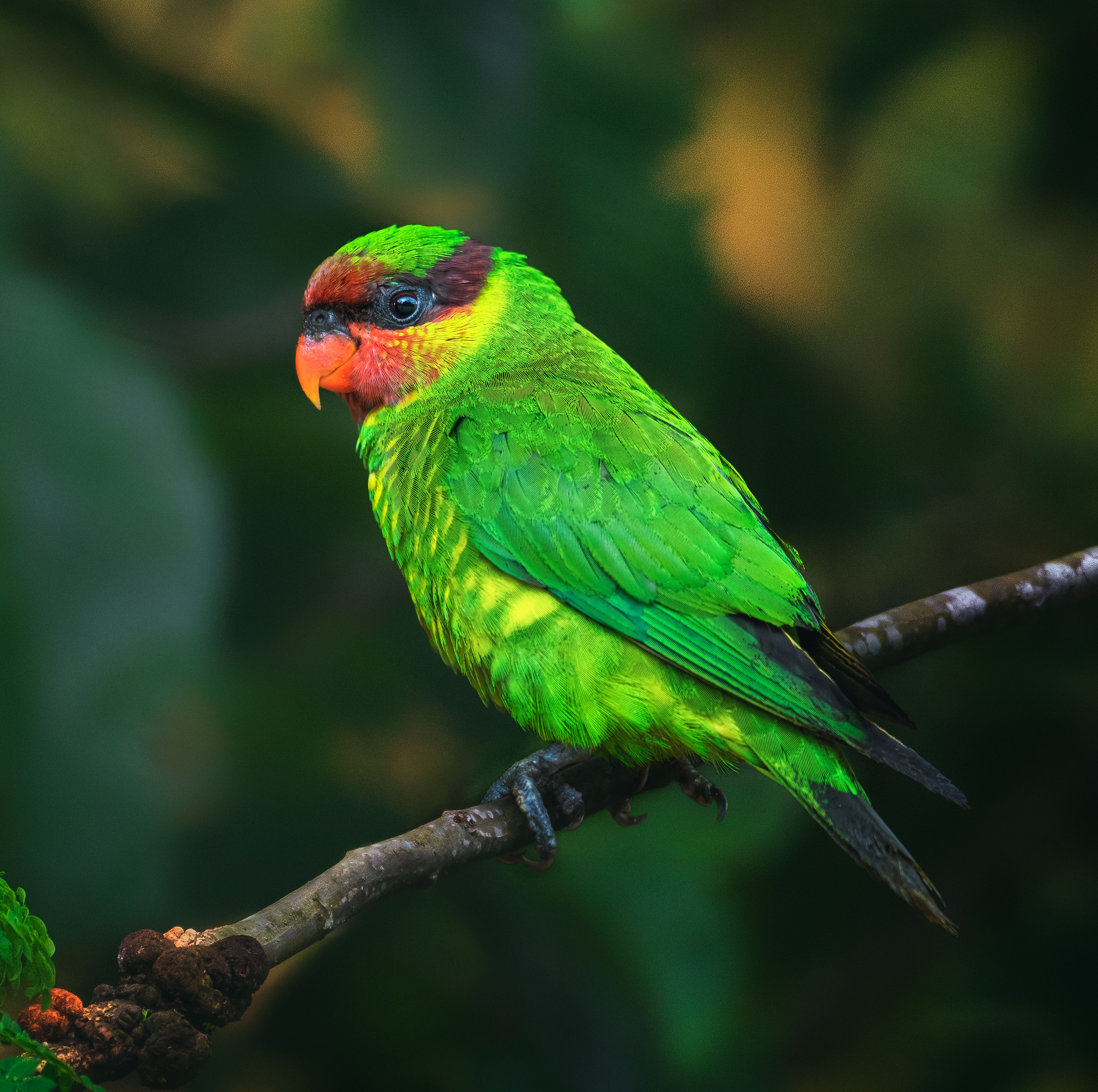

Conservation status
- Near Threatened (IUCN 3.1)

Scientific classification
- Kingdom: Animalia
- Phylum: Chordata
- Class: Aves
- Order: Psittaciformes
- Family: Psittaculidae
- Genus: Trichoglossus
- Species: T. johnstoniae

Binomial name
- Trichoglossus johnstoniae Hartert, EJO, 1903

Synonyms
- Saudareos johnstoniae

= Mindanao lorikeet =

Species of bird

The Mindanao lorikeet or Mount Apo lorikeet (Trichoglossus johnstoniae) is a species of parrot in the family Psittaculidae. It is only found in the Philippines on the island of Mindanao. Its natural habitat is tropical moist montane forests. It is threatened by habitat loss and trapping for the illegal wildlife trade. IUCN estimates the population to be as low as 1,500 individuals with it going locally extinct in areas of its range.

It is illegal to hunt, capture, or keep Mindanao lorikeets and any other wild bird in the Philippines under Philippine Law RA 9147.

== Description ==
The Mindanao lorikeet is 20 cm (7.9 in) long. Its green and has a beautiful color on the front. Its face is red, and it has a dark purple band on the head. It has many beautiful parts under the wing. Its feet are gray. Its beak is orange, the area around its eyes is dark gray, and its iris is red. Males and females are the same in appearance. The young have less red on the face and instead of the purple band they have brown on the back of the eye, gray around their eyes, brown on their iris, and dark brown on their beak.

== Behaviour and ecology ==
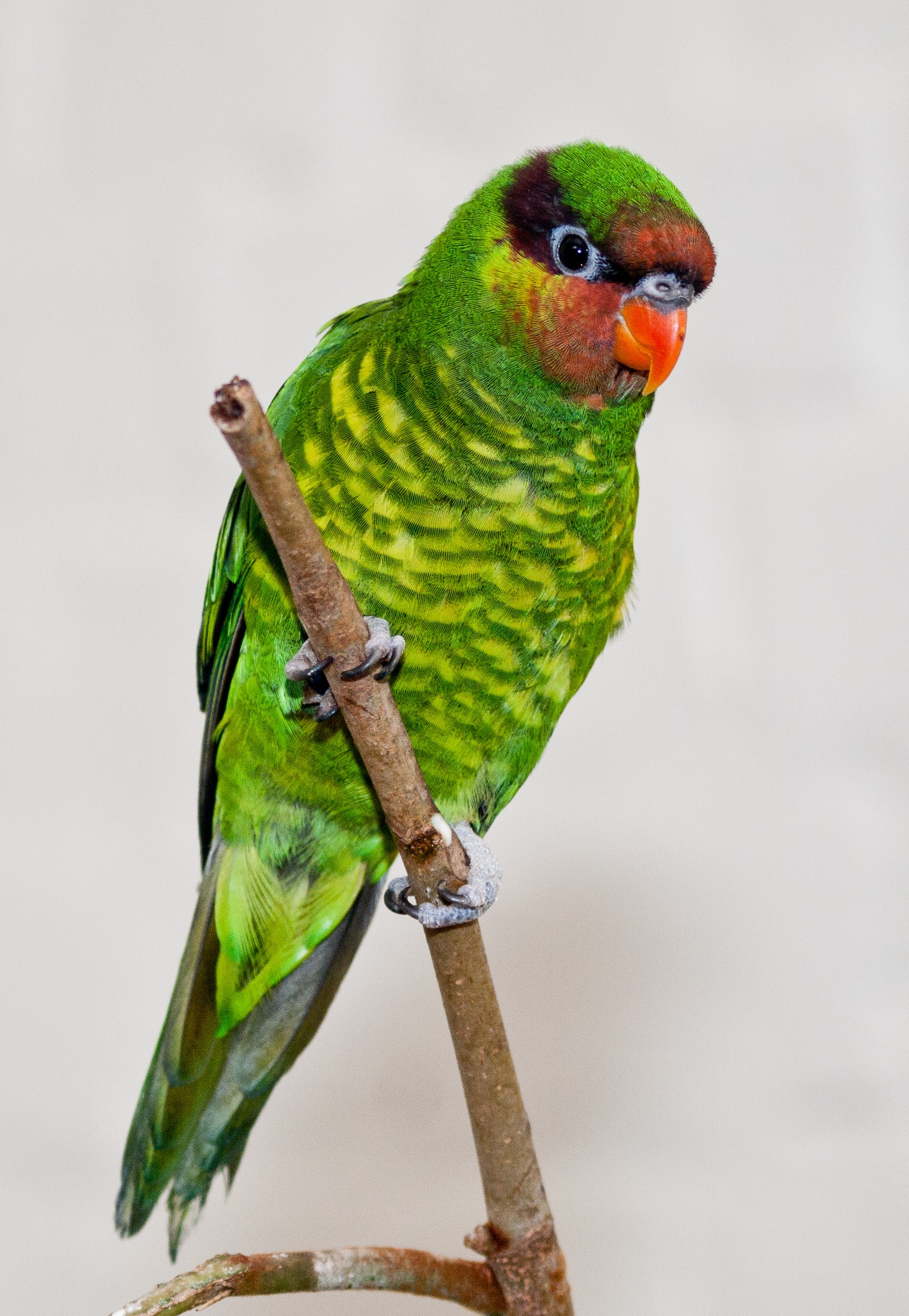
A captive Mindanao lorikeet in London Zoo

Mindanao lorikeets are known to travel between altitudes, typically roosting in lower altitude areas and then feeding in highest forest during daytime. Feeds on fruits and nectar.

Birds found in breeding condition with enlarged gonads in March and May which is in line with the general breeding season of Philippine forest birds. Lays two eggs in captivity which incubate relatively quickly at just two weeks and fledge within 30–35 days.

== Habitat and conservation status ==
The species inhabits montane forest and forest edge above 1,000 metres (3,300 ft) above sea level. The IUCN has classified the species as near threatened.

However, this status is contested and it is generally believed that this species is much more threatened than what its IUCN status suggests. The IUCN report accounts for its habitat loss through deforestation, mining, land conversion and slash-and-burn. Relative to lowland forest, due to its ruggedness and inaccessibility, montane forest is relatively secure. However, its biggest threat is the trapping for the pet trade, even in areas where the forest has mostly remained intact this bird has now become extremely rare or even locally extinct in some areas. Due to these local extinctions, the Philippine Red List has listed it as vulnerable.

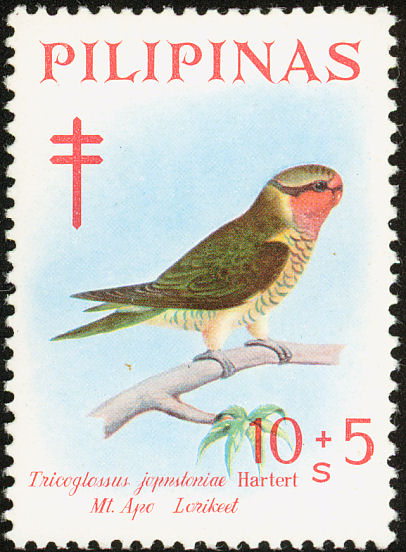
A Philippine postal stamp from 1969 featuring this species

It is found in multiple protected areas such as Mount Apo and Kitanglad Mountain Range but like all areas in the Philippines protection is lax.

There are no species specific conservation plans at the moment but conservation actions proposed by the IUCN Red List are to do surveys to better understand population and range and to better protect its habitat.
