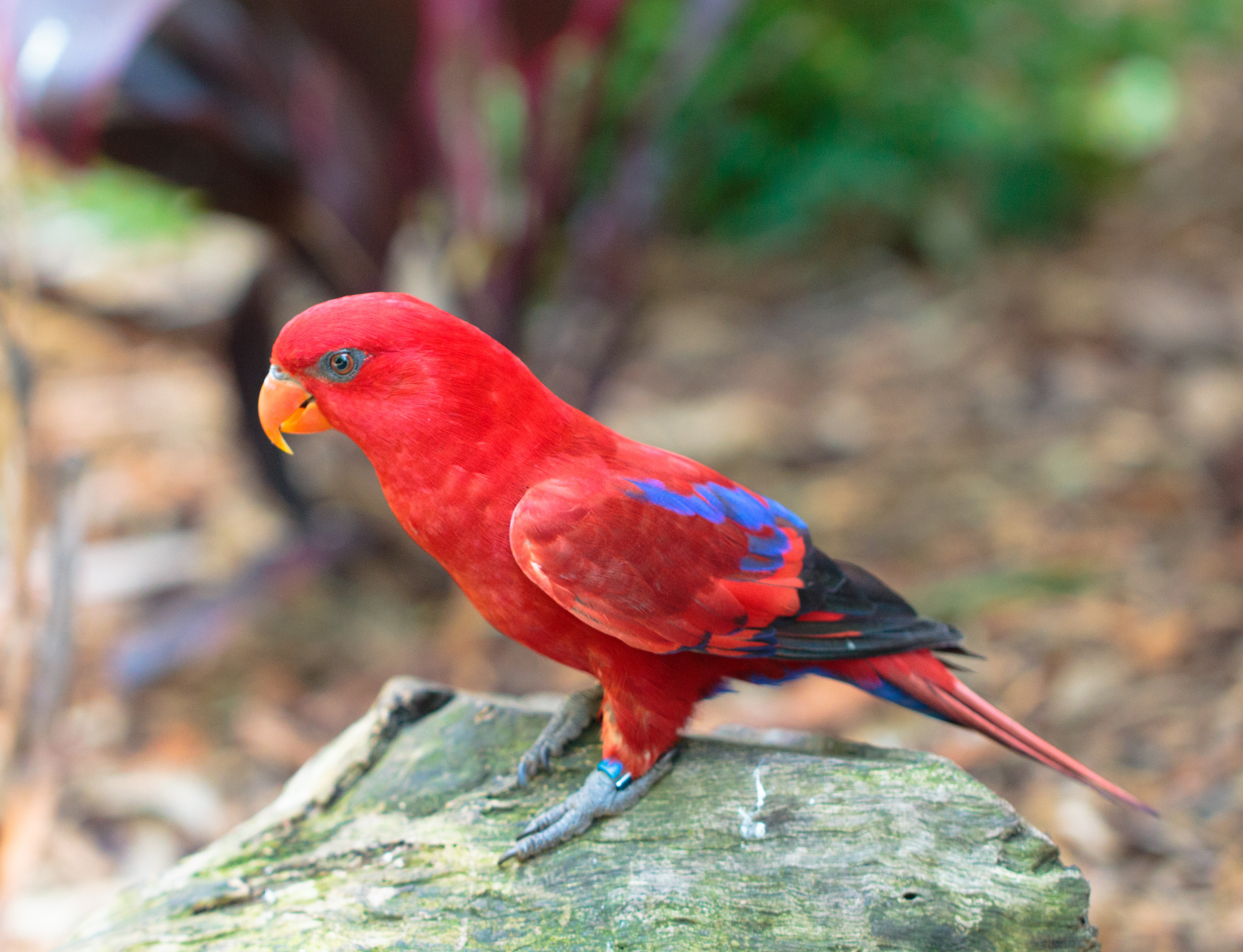
- At Taronga Zoo, Sydney, Australia

Conservation status
- Least Concern (IUCN 3.1)

Scientific classification
- Kingdom: Animalia
- Phylum: Chordata
- Class: Aves
- Order: Psittaciformes
- Family: Psittaculidae
- Genus: Trichoglossus
- Species: T. borneus

Binomial name
- Trichoglossus borneus (Linnaeus, 1758)

Synonyms
- Eos goodfellowi Ogilvie-Grant, 1907; Psittacus borneus Linnaeus, 1758; Eos bornea

= Red lory =

Species of bird

The red lory (Trichoglossus borneus) is a species of parrot in the family Psittaculidae. It is the second-most commonly kept lory in captivity, after the rainbow lorikeet.

== Taxonomy ==
In 1751 the English naturalist George Edwards included an illustration and a description of the red lory in the fourth volume of his A Natural History of Uncommon Birds. He used the English name "The long-tailed scarlet lory". Edwards based his hand-coloured etching on a stuffed specimen that he had purchased from a toyshop in London. He was uncertain of its origin. Edward gave his specimen to the collector Hans Sloane and subsequently a visitor to Sloane's house suggested that the bird may have come from Borneo. When in 1758 the Swedish naturalist Carl Linnaeus updated his Systema Naturae for the tenth edition, he placed the red lory with the other parrots in the genus Psittacus. Linnaeus included a brief description, coined the binomial name Psittacus borneus and cited Edwards' work. The red lory is now placed in the genus Trichoglossus that was introduced by the English naturalist James Francis Stephens in 1826. The specific epithet borneus, bornea is a toponym from Borneo. This is an error as the species does not occur on the island.

There is some uncertainty as to whether Edwards' plate actually depicts a red lory and the binomial name Eos rubra (Gmelin, 1788) has sometimes been used for this species.

The word "lory" comes from the Malay lūri, a name used for a number of species of colourful parrots. The name was used by the Dutch writer Johan Nieuhof in 1682 in a book describing his travels in the East Indies. The spelling "laurey" was used by English naturalist Eleazar Albin in 1731 for a species of parrot from Brazil, and then in 1751 Edwards used the spelling "lory" for five species of parrot from the East Indies. Edwards credited Nieuhof for the name.

Two subspecies are recognised:

- T. b. cyanonothus (Vieillot, 1818) – Buru (central Maluku Islands)
- T. b. borneus (Linnaeus, 1758) – south Maluku Islands and Kai Islands

== Description ==
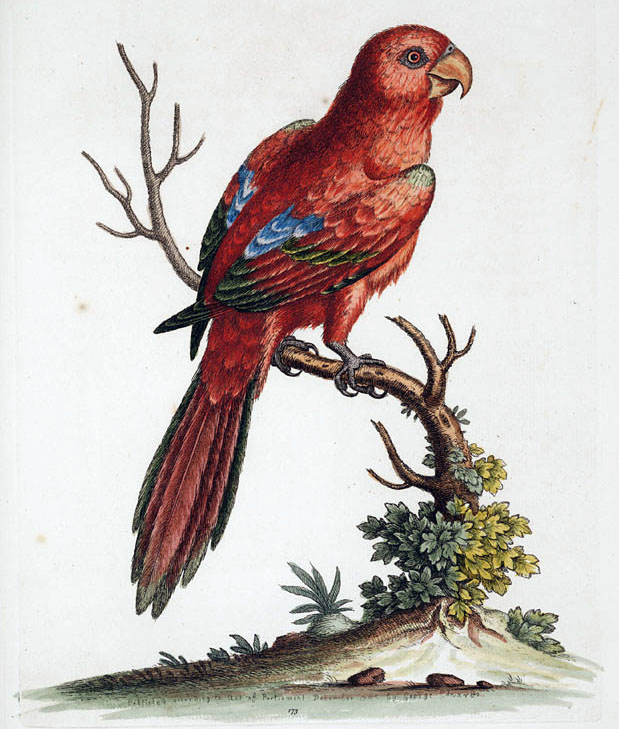
Type illustration of Eos bornea

The red lory is about 31 cm (12 in) long. They weigh 30-300 grams. It is mostly red and all the plumage of the upper body is red. There are red, blue, and black marks on the back and wings, and the tail is reddish-brown with blue under-tail coverts. The beak is orange and the legs are grey. The irises are red except in E. b. bernsteini, which has brown irises. There is no bare skin at the base of the lower mandible. The male and female have identical external appearance. Juveniles are duller and have brown irises and a brownish beak. Their bills are narrower and less powerful than other types of parrots and their gizzards are generally thin-walled and weak. A defining characteristic of a Lory is their brush tongues with papillae at the tips to help them feed on pollen and nectar.

== Distribution and habitat ==
Lories and lorikeets live in Indonesia, New Guinea, Australia and the Pacific. The red lory in particular is endemic to the Moluccas and surrounding islands in Indonesia. Its natural habitats are tropical moist lowland forests and tropical mangrove forests. It also was introduced to Taiwan.

== Aviculture ==
This intelligent bird has a playful personality and a colourful appearance. They are often described as flamboyant, theatrical and pugnacious birds. The subspecies, Buru red lory (Eos bornea cyanonothus) is darker, more maroon in colour, and is often confused in captivity with the nominate. Inadvertent interbreeding between the two subspecies has made a clear identification difficult for pet owners as hybrids can be found. The other two subspecies are not as common, Rothschild's red lory (Eos bornea rothschildi) and Bernstein's red lory (Eos bornea bernsteini). Lories are very intelligent, trainable, affectionate, playful and curious and they can display interesting behaviors. For example, some lories have wrapped themselves in a washcloth for sleeping or some sleep on their backs with their feet up in the air. When kept as a pet, they should be given toys (ropes, balls, swings), chewing items and branches. They require much attention and care. They should be bathed frequently in a bird bath, bowl or shower, and they can be dried by the sun or by a blow drier. Young birds must be socialized and exposed to new people and new things (new cages, toys, vet visits, wing and nail clippings). Outdoor housing is preferred, but if housed in cages, the cages must be large and cleaned often. They may be kept alone or with others, as long as they are closely monitored for signs of aggression. Mated pairs defend their territories forcefully.

== Diet ==
In the wild, lories eat nectar, pollen, fruits, and occasional insects. As pets they should be fed a good formulated diet. Smaller lories should be fed fresh nectar (commercial or home-made) daily. Larger birds can be fed pellets from a bird food company, or fruits and vegetables such as apples, pomegranates, papaya, grapes, cantaloupe, pineapple, figs, kiwi, and corn-on-the-cob. Lories can be given treats to reward positive behavior. Fresh, clean water should be provided daily.

== Gallery ==
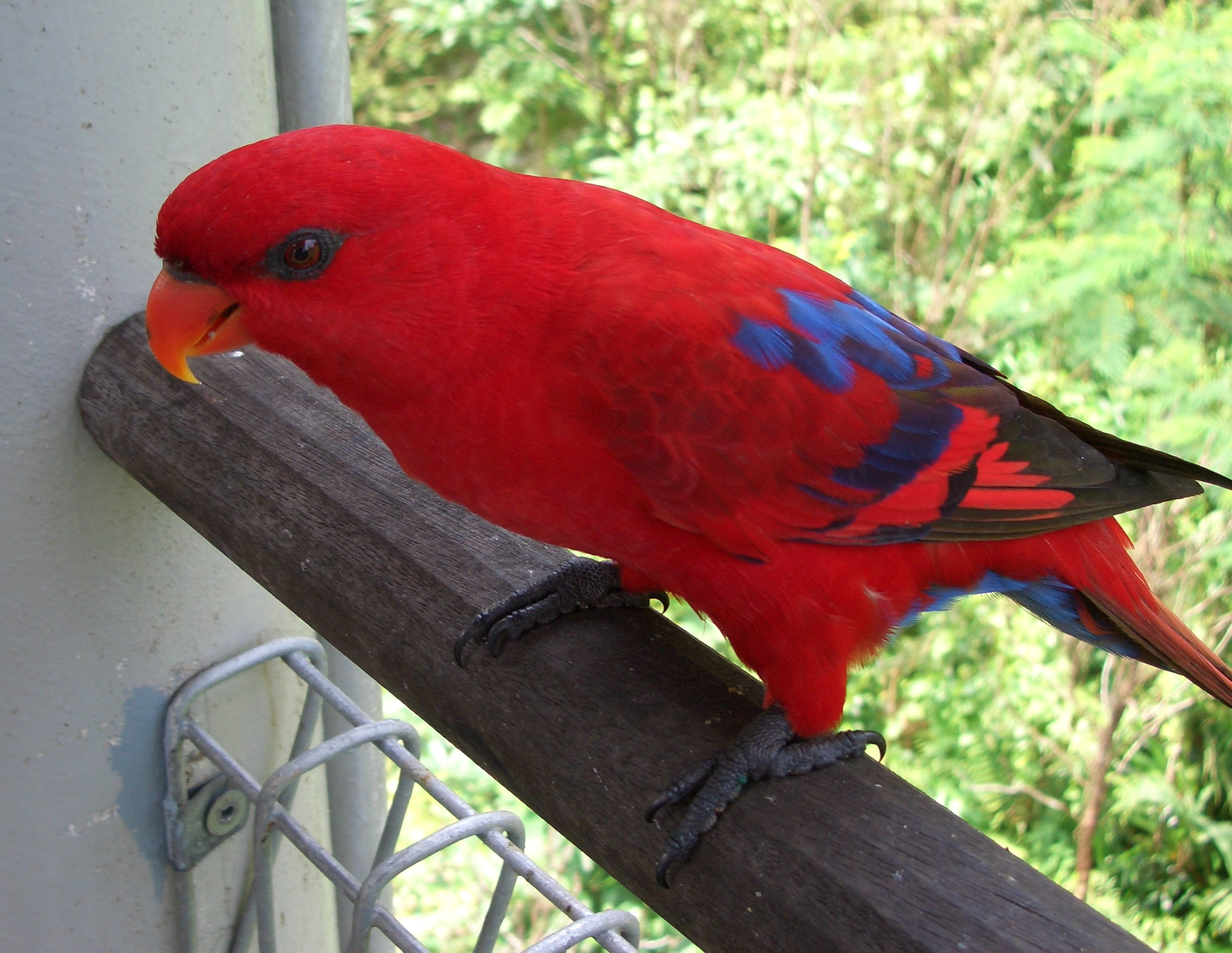

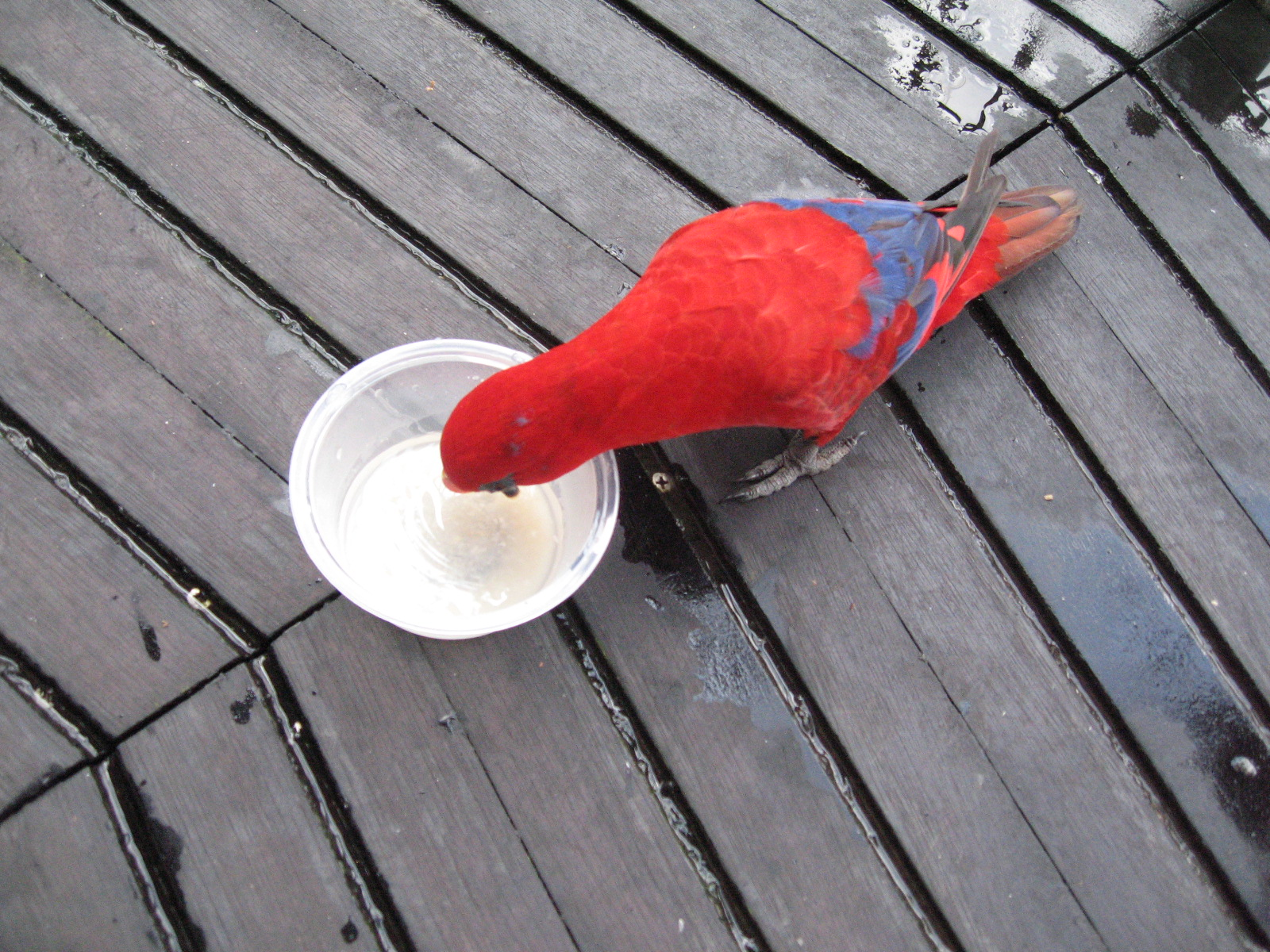

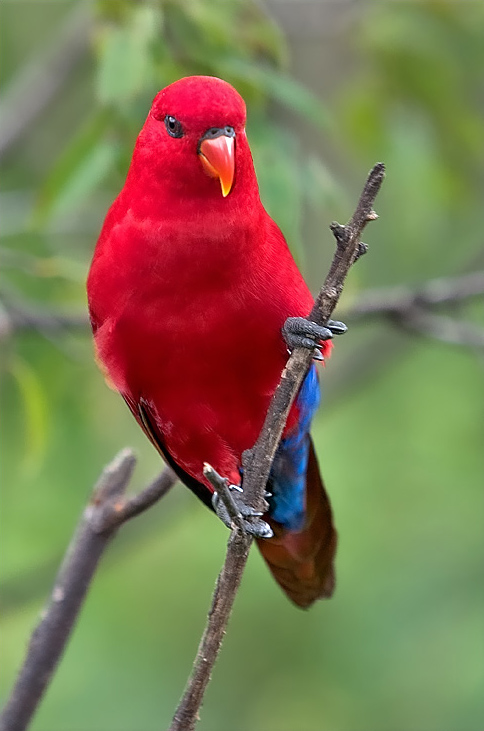
Jurong BirdPark, Singapore, Jurong

Jurong BirdPark. Video clip

== Cited texts ==
- Forshaw, Joseph M. (2006). Parrots of the World; an Identification Guide. Illustrated by Frank Knight. Princeton University Press. ISBN 0-691-09251-6.
