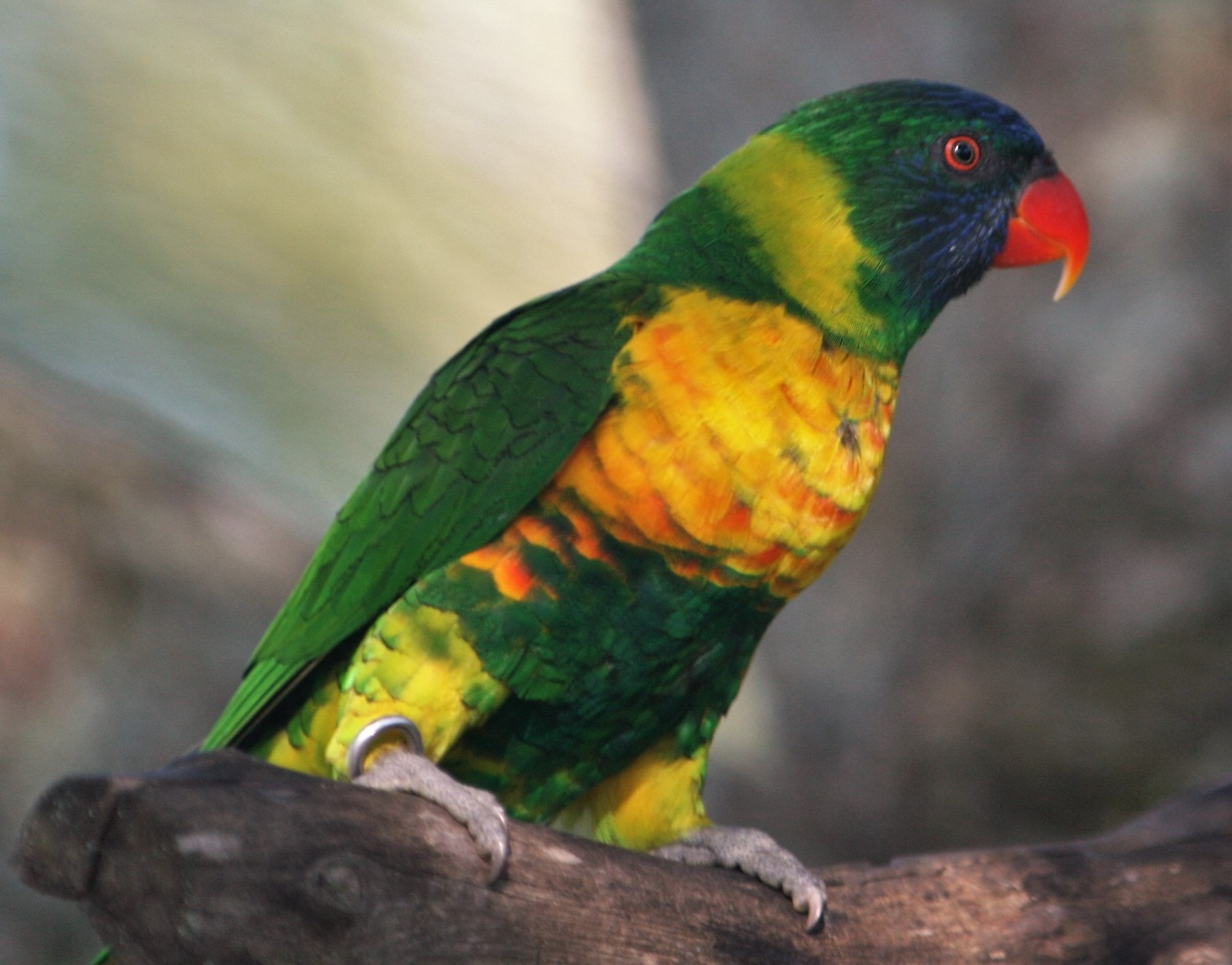
- At Lion Country Safari, Florida

Conservation status
- Least Concern (IUCN 3.1)

Scientific classification
- Kingdom: Animalia
- Phylum: Chordata
- Class: Aves
- Order: Psittaciformes
- Family: Psittaculidae
- Genus: Trichoglossus
- Species: T. capistratus

Binomial name
- Trichoglossus capistratus (Bechstein, 1811)

= Marigold lorikeet =

Species of bird

The marigold lorikeet or Sumba lorikeet (Trichoglossus capistratus) is a species of parrot that is endemic to the Southeast Asian islands of Sumba, Rote, Wetar and Kisar (Indonesia) and Timor (Indonesia and Timor-Leste). It was previously considered a subspecies of the rainbow lorikeet, but following a review in 1997, it is increasingly treated as a separate species.

Overall, the marigold lorikeet resembles a faded rainbow or scarlet-breasted lorikeet, with the blue to the head not as strongly demarcated and the chest ranging from orange-yellow to yellow. In addition to the nominate subspecies from Timor, it includes the subspecies fortis ("Edward's lorikeet") from Sumba and flavotectus ("Wetar lorikeet") from Wetar. It inhabits the edge of primary forest, secondary forest, woodland and plantations at altitudes below 500 m (1,600 ft) on Timor, but at least up to 950 m (3,120 ft) on Sumba. It remains fairly common, but its relatively small distribution could give cause for future concern.
