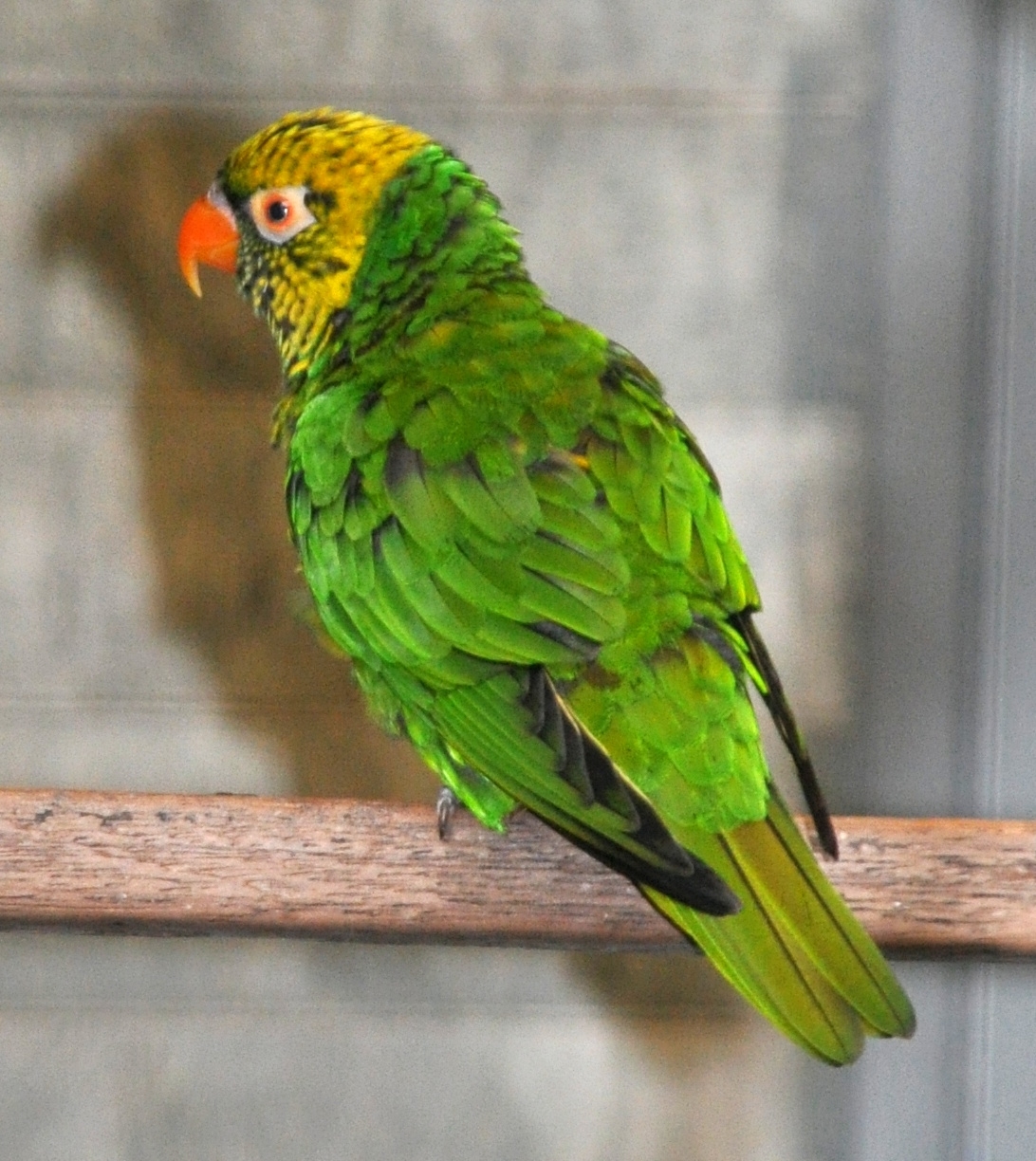
- at Weltvogelpark Walsrode, Germany

Conservation status
- Near Threatened (IUCN 3.1)

Scientific classification
- Kingdom: Animalia
- Phylum: Chordata
- Class: Aves
- Order: Psittaciformes
- Family: Psittaculidae
- Genus: Trichoglossus
- Species: T. flavoviridis

Binomial name
- Trichoglossus flavoviridis Wallace, 1863

Synonyms
- Saudareos flavoviridis

= Sula lorikeet =

Species of bird

The Sula lorikeet (Trichoglossus flavoviridis) is a species of parrot in the family Psittaculidae. It is endemic to the Sula Islands in Indonesia. It is found in forest and woodland at altitudes up to 2,400 m (7,900 ft). It is generally common.

== Taxonomy ==
This species was previously placed in the genus Saudareos but was moved back to Trichoglossus by the AviList team to create more inclusive genera in the Loriini tribe of the family Psittaculidae. It was formerly considered conspecific with the yellow-cheeked lorikeet and collectively called the citrine lorikeet.

== Description ==
The Sula lorikeet is a mainly green parrot about 20 cm (8 in) long. Its bill is orange. In the nominate subspecies the head and chest are yellow, the latter narrowly scaled with green, and the lores and region near the bill are dark, often appearing almost blackish.
