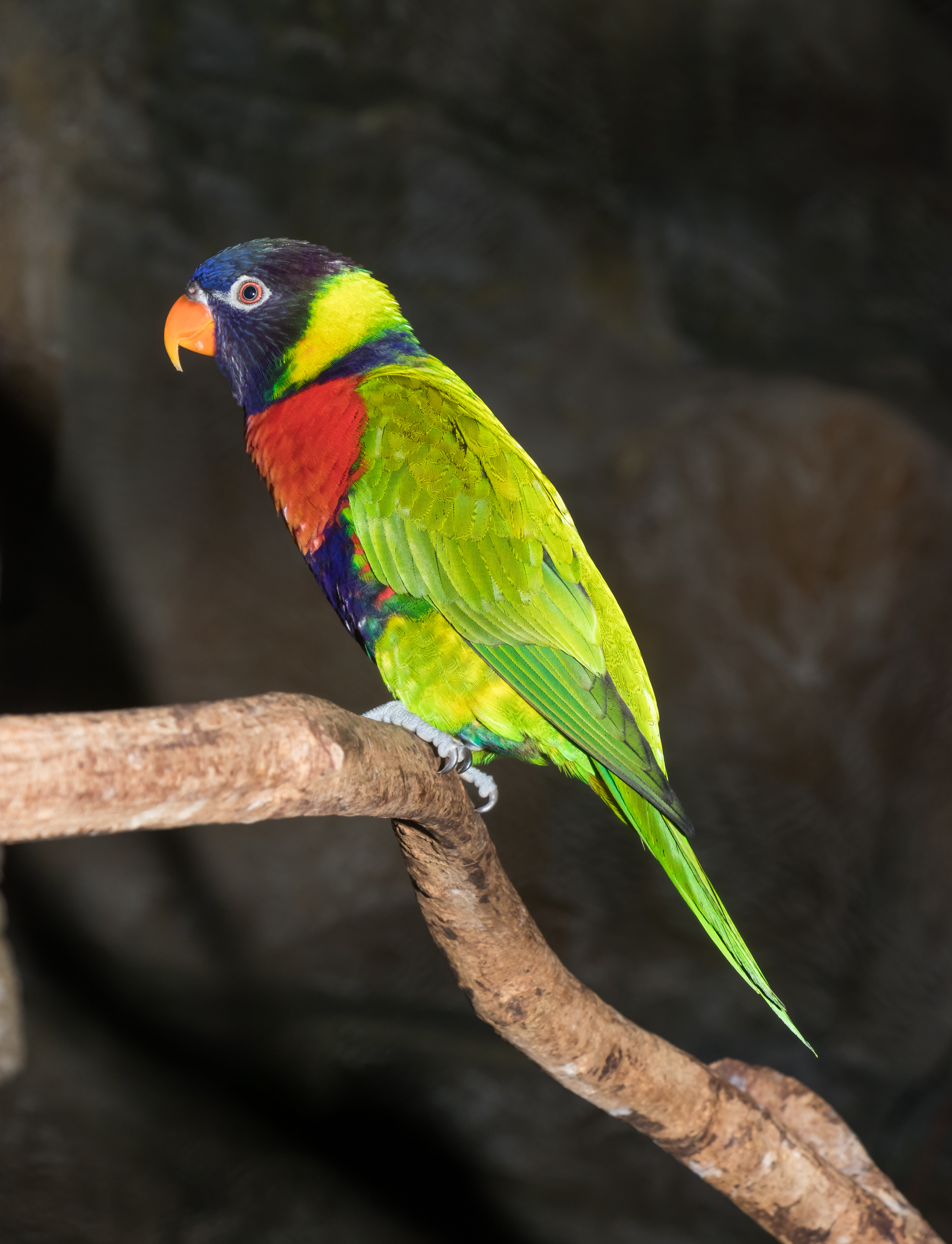
- At Karlsruhe Zoo, Germany

Conservation status
- Endangered (IUCN 3.1)

Scientific classification
- Kingdom: Animalia
- Phylum: Chordata
- Class: Aves
- Order: Psittaciformes
- Family: Psittaculidae
- Genus: Trichoglossus
- Species: T. forsteni

Binomial name
- Trichoglossus forsteni Bonaparte, 1850

= Sunset lorikeet =

Species of bird

The sunset lorikeet (Trichoglossus forsteni), also known as the scarlet-breasted lorikeet or Forsten's lorikeet, is a species of parrot that is endemic to the Indonesian islands of Bali, Lombok, Sumbawa, Tanah Jampea (between Sulawesi and Flores), and Kalaotoa (between Sulawesi and Flores). It was previously considered a subspecies of the rainbow lorikeet, but following a review in 1997, it is increasingly treated as a separate species.

In addition to the nominate subspecies from Sumbawa, it includes the subspecies mitchellii ("Mitchell's lorikeet") from Bali and Lombok, djampeanus ("Djampea lorikeet") from the small island Tanah Jampea, and stresemanni ("Stresemann's lorikeet") from the small island Kalaotoa.

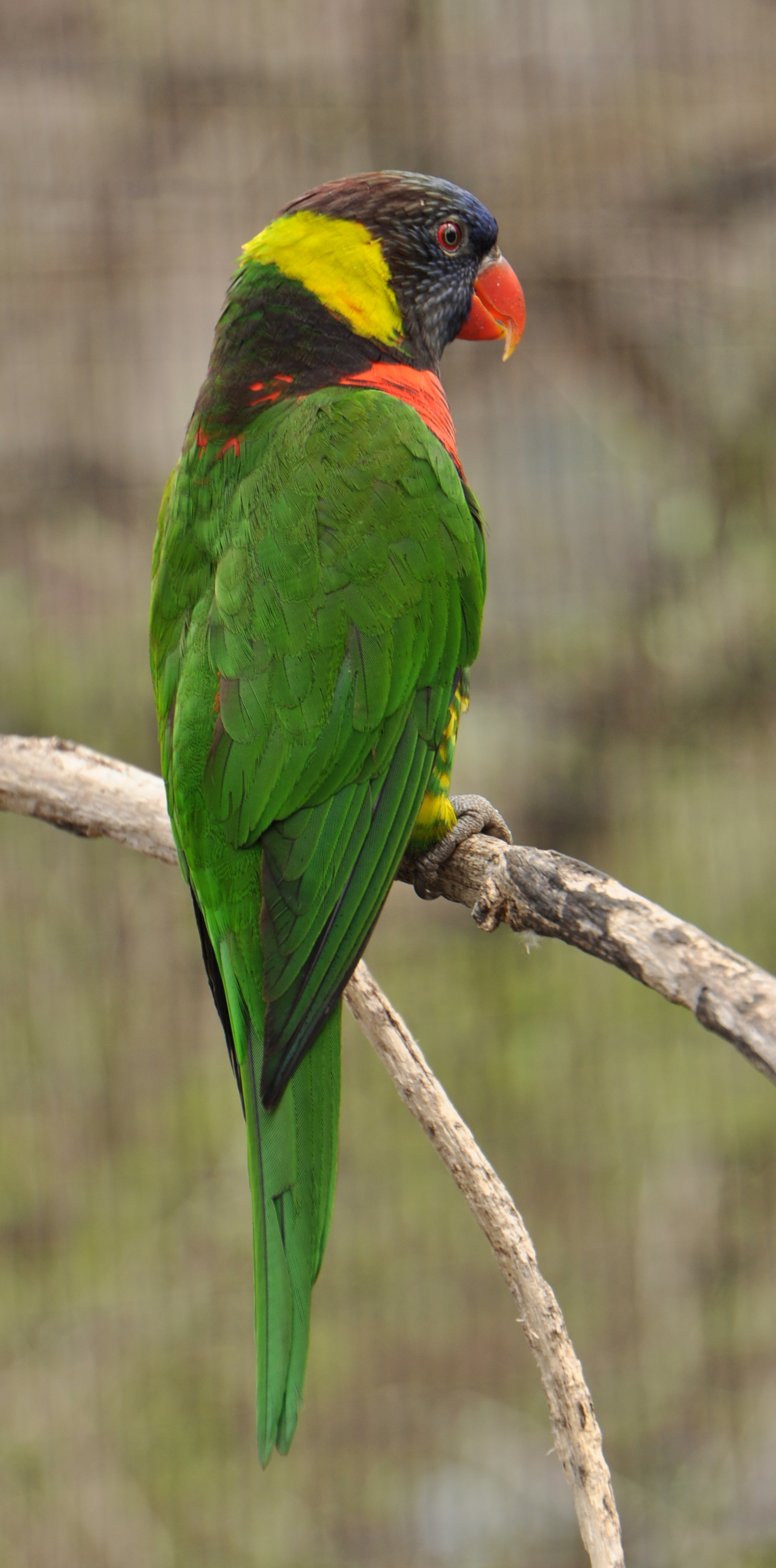
At Cincinnati Zoo, USA

It is the darkest and arguably most strongly marked member of the rainbow lorikeet group, with a dark bluish head that contrasts strongly with a lime green nape and a deep scarlet (most subspecies) or deep orange (subspecies stresemanni) breast, that again contrasts strongly with the dark bluish belly.

It inhabits forest, woodland and plantations at altitudes below 1,200 m (3,900 ft) on Sumabwa, but up to 2,150 m (7,050 ft) on Lombok. Its small range combined with extensive habitat destruction and capture for the parrot trade gives cause for serious concerns. It remains fairly common on Sumbawa, but is scarce or rare elsewhere. It appears to have been extirpated from Tanahjampea, and may have been extirpated from Bali and Kalaotoa.
