= Taronga Western Plains Zoo =

Zoo in New South Wales, Australia

- Taronga Western Plains Zoo logo
- Interactive map of Taronga Western Plains Zoo
- 32°16′18.8″S 148°35′14″E
- Date opened: 28 February 1977; 49 years ago
- Location: Dubbo, New South Wales, Australia
- Land area: 300 ha (741 acres)
- No. of animals: over 1,000
- No. of species: 40+
- Major exhibits: 45
- Website: taronga.org.au/taronga-western-plains-zoo

Taronga Western Plains Zoo, formerly known as (and still commonly referred to as) Western Plains Zoo and commonly known as Dubbo Zoo, is a large zoo in Dubbo, New South Wales, Australia. It opened to the public on 28 February 1977, to provide more living and breeding space for large animals such as elephants and antelopes which needed more space than was available at the restricted Sydney site. The zoo is run by the Taronga Conservation Society (formerly Zoological Parks Board of New South Wales), along with Taronga Zoo Sydney. Western Plains Zoo is located on the Newell Highway in west Dubbo about 5 km from the city.

== History ==
In the late 1960s, plans to develop a large plains zoo to complement Sydney's Taronga Zoo were established. The new zoo would provide breeding facilities particularly suited to the large plains dwelling animals and to fulfil a need for an open range facility for the display of mainly grazing animals. After considerable planning and preparation, a site on the outskirts of Dubbo in central West New South Wales was chosen. Formerly an army camp during World War Two, the site was transformed into a 300 hectare zoo of woodland and irrigated grasslands.

Western Plains Zoo opened to the public on 28 February 1977. When the zoo opened, it contained 35 different animals from six countries. The zoo is an open-range design, with walls and fences replaced by concealed moats which divide the animals from the visitors. This creates the impression of actually being with the animals in the wild. It was also the first zoo to be built in Australia in 60 years.

Queen Elizabeth II, Queen of Australia visited the Western Plains Zoo in 1992.

In 1994 Western Plains Zoo was awarded as the Best Major Tourist Attraction, the highest honour in Australian Tourism.

On 26 September 2006, The Daily Liberal published an article announcing British comedian John Cleese was visiting the zoo "in order to raise money for a new Greater One-Horned rhino exhibit".

=== Name change ===
The zoo changed its name to Taronga Western Plains Zoo on 21 January 2008, citing the need to draw attention to the work of the Taronga Conservation Society Australia.

=== Zoo friends ===
Zoo Friends was an organisation which offered support in form of volunteers and fund raising for both Taronga Zoo Sydney and Western Plains Zoo. Members were eligible to volunteer to help at the Zoo. In 2009 the organisation was disbanded and all assets donated to the Taronga Conservation Foundation. Taronga Zoo Sydney now runs its own volunteer program.

== Animals ==
Africa

- Addax
- African lion
- Barbary sheep
- Black-and-white ruffed lemur
- Common eland
- Dromedary camel
- Eastern bongo
- Giraffe
- Helmeted guineafowl
- Hippopotamus
- Meerkat
- Ostrich
- Plains zebra
- Ring-tailed lemur
- Scimitar-horned oryx
- South-central black rhinoceros
- Southeast African cheetah
- Southern white rhinoceros

Americas

- Black-handed spider monkey
- Galápagos tortoise

Asia

- Asian mainland elephant
- Asian small-clawed otter
- Banteng
- Blackbuck
- Greater one-horned rhinoceros
- Indian peafowl
- Siamang
- Sri Lankan elephant
- Sumatran tiger
- Takhi
- White-handed gibbon

Australia

- Australian zebra finch
- Eastern grey kangaroo (wild roaming)
- Eastern whipbird
- Emu
- Koala
- Little lorikeet
- Malleefowl
- Platypus
- Quokka
- Red kangaroo
- Red-necked wallaby
- Regent honeyeater
- Scaly-breasted lorikeet
- Short-beaked echidna
- Smooth yabby
- Southern hairy-nosed wombat
- Southern purple-spotted gudgeon
- Swamp wallaby
- Tasmanian devil
- Western quoll
- White-browed woodswallow
- White-winged chough

Europe/Eurasia

- Domestic goat
- European fallow deer

== Gallery ==
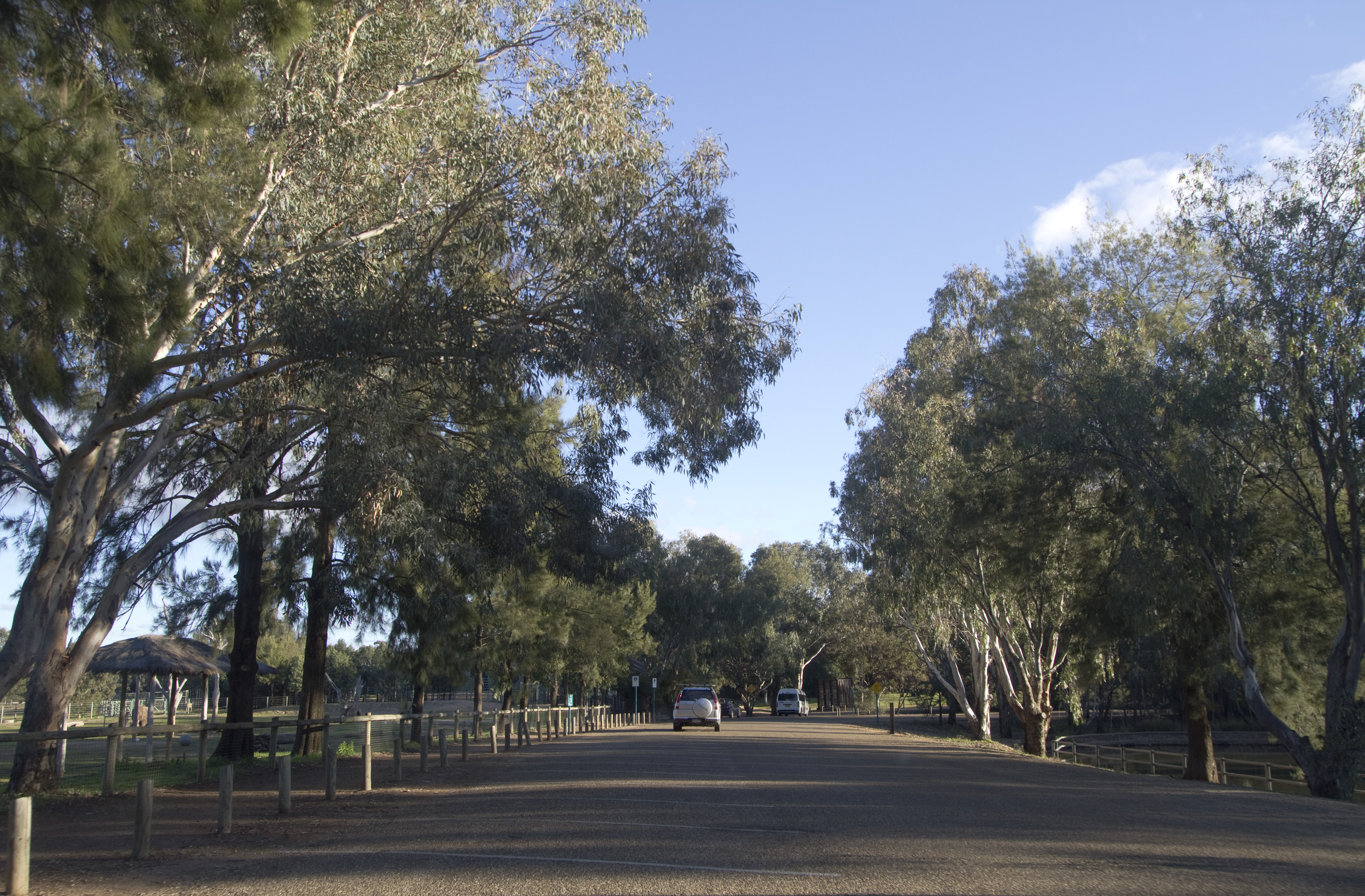
Visitor road

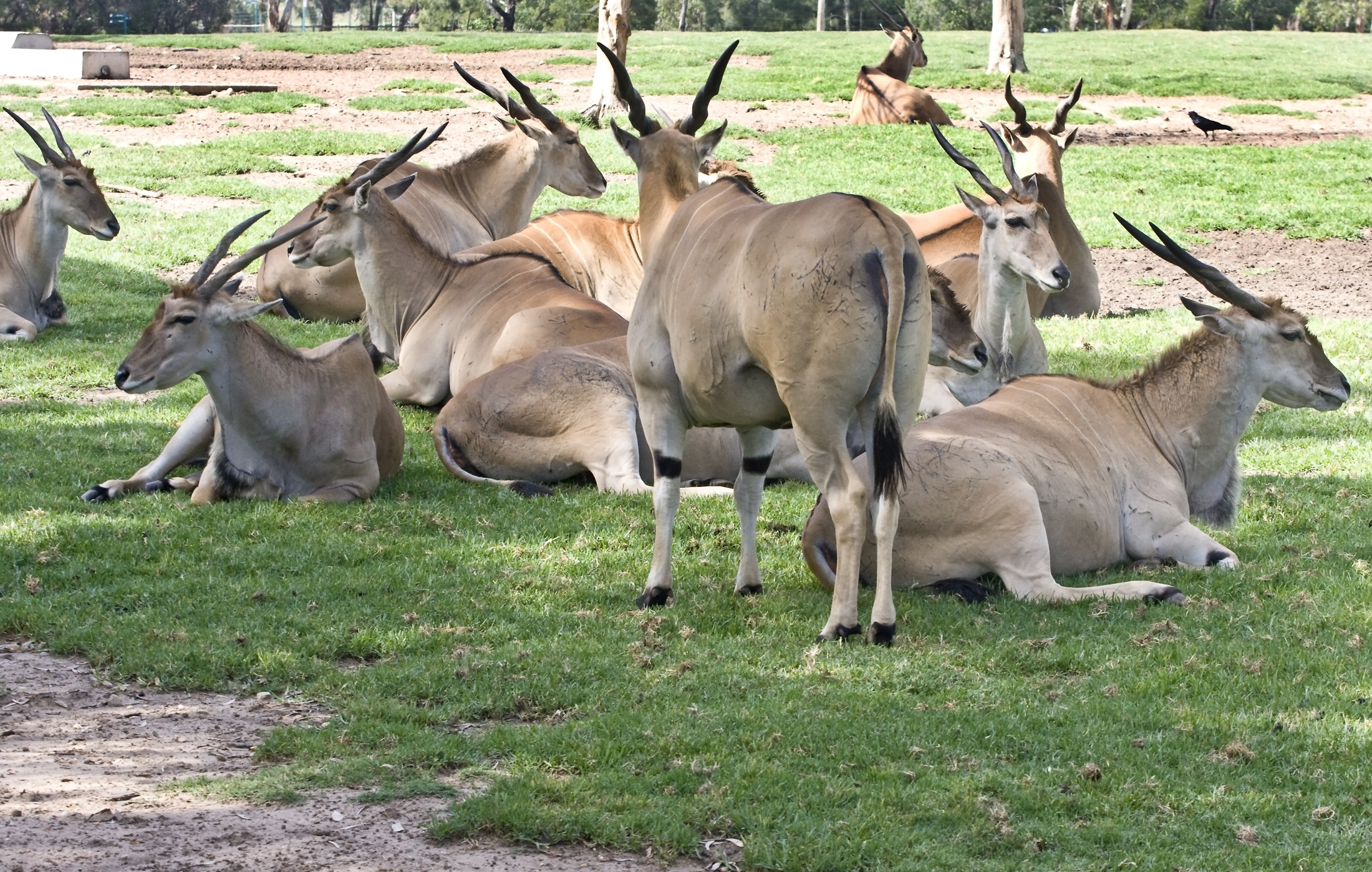
Common elands

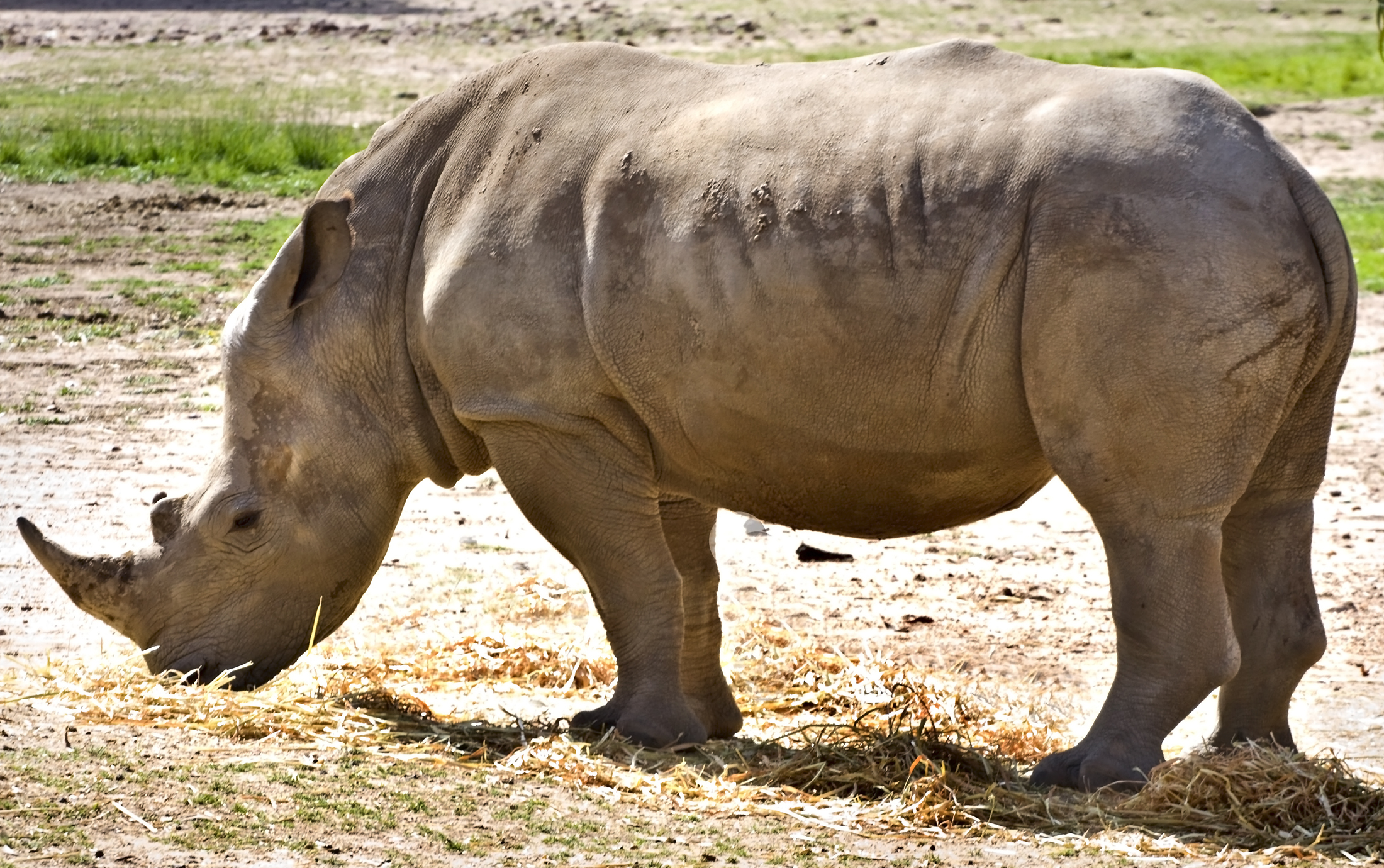
Southern white rhinoceros

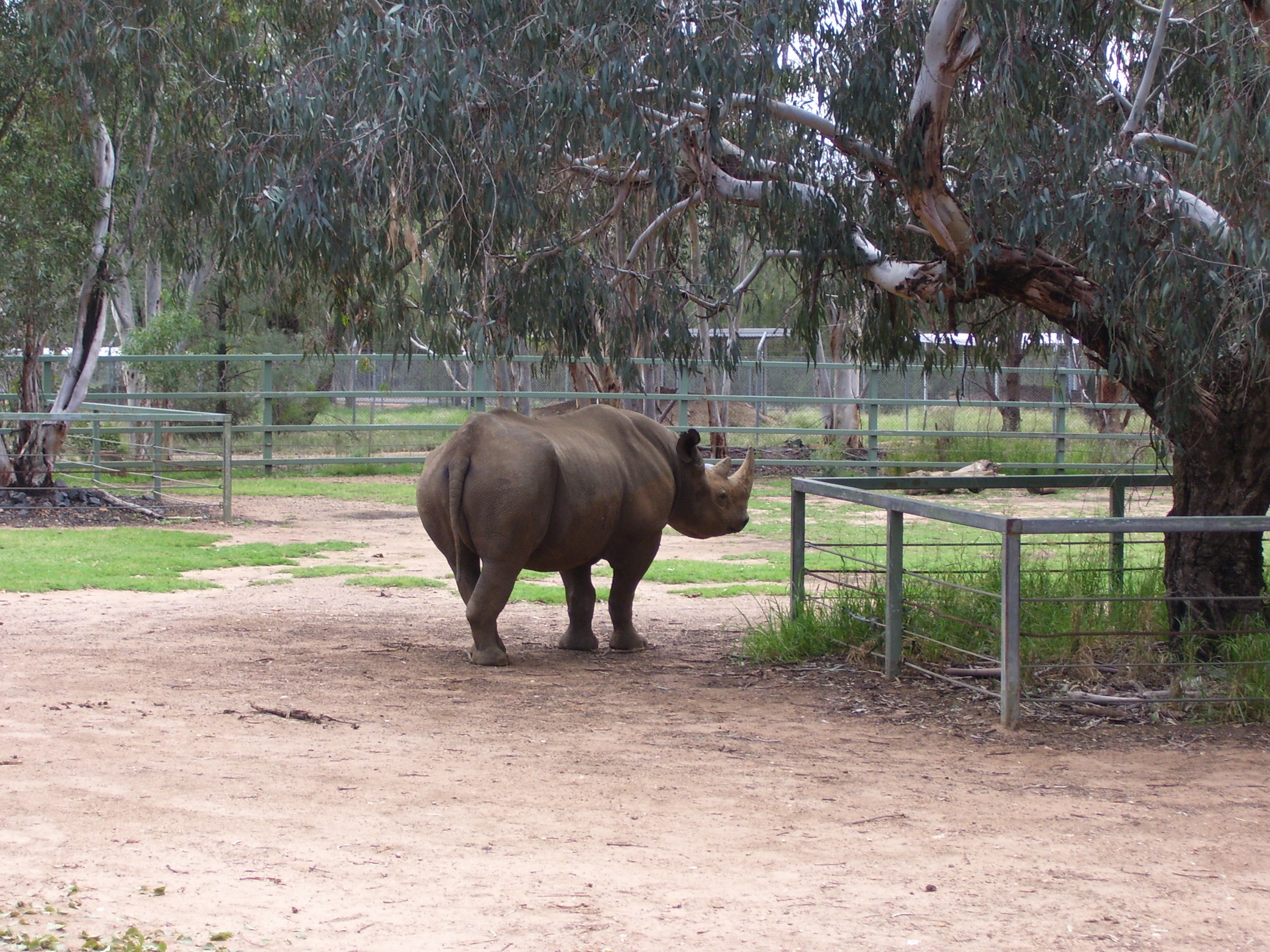
South-central black rhinoceros

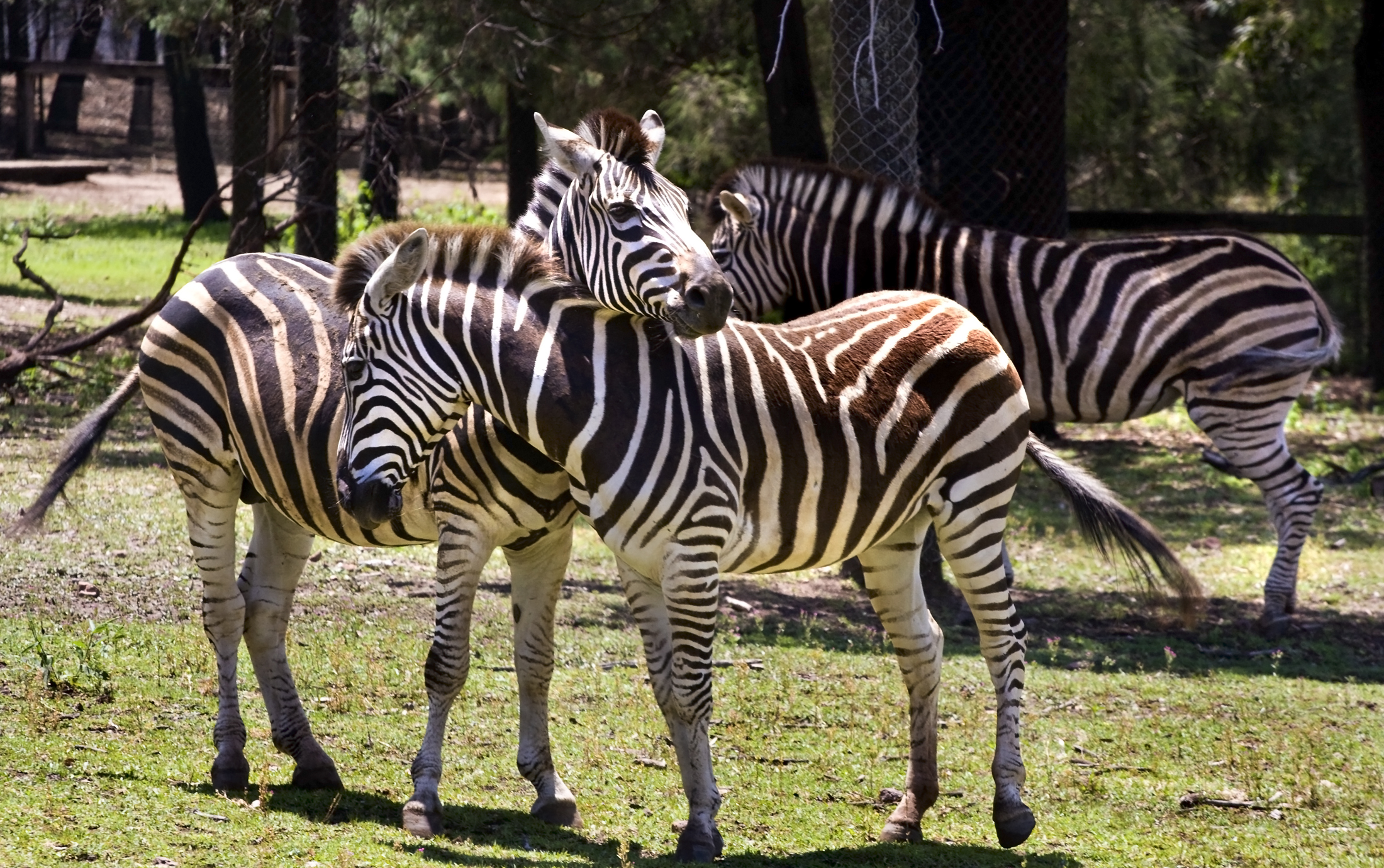
Plains zebras

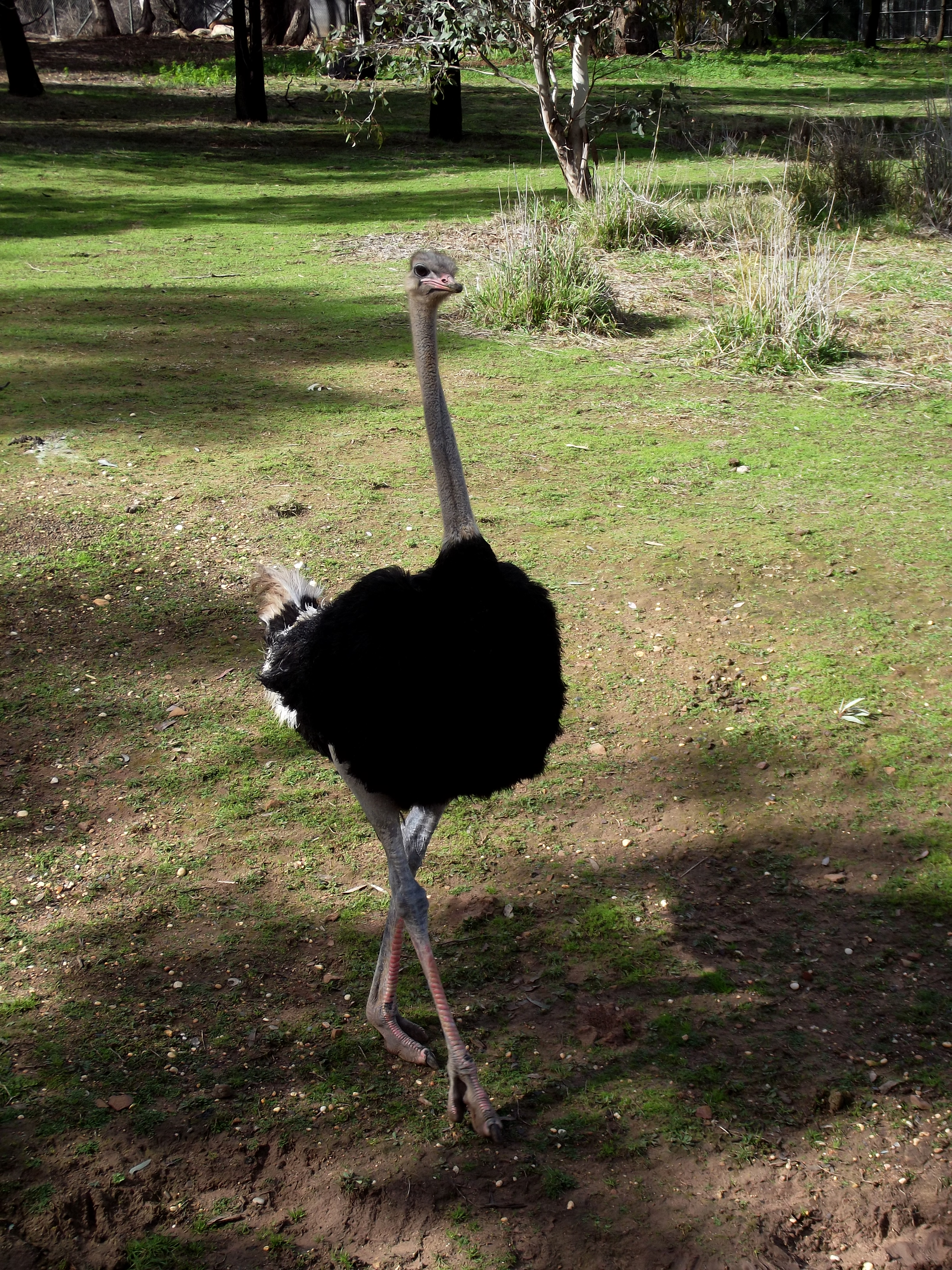
Ostrich

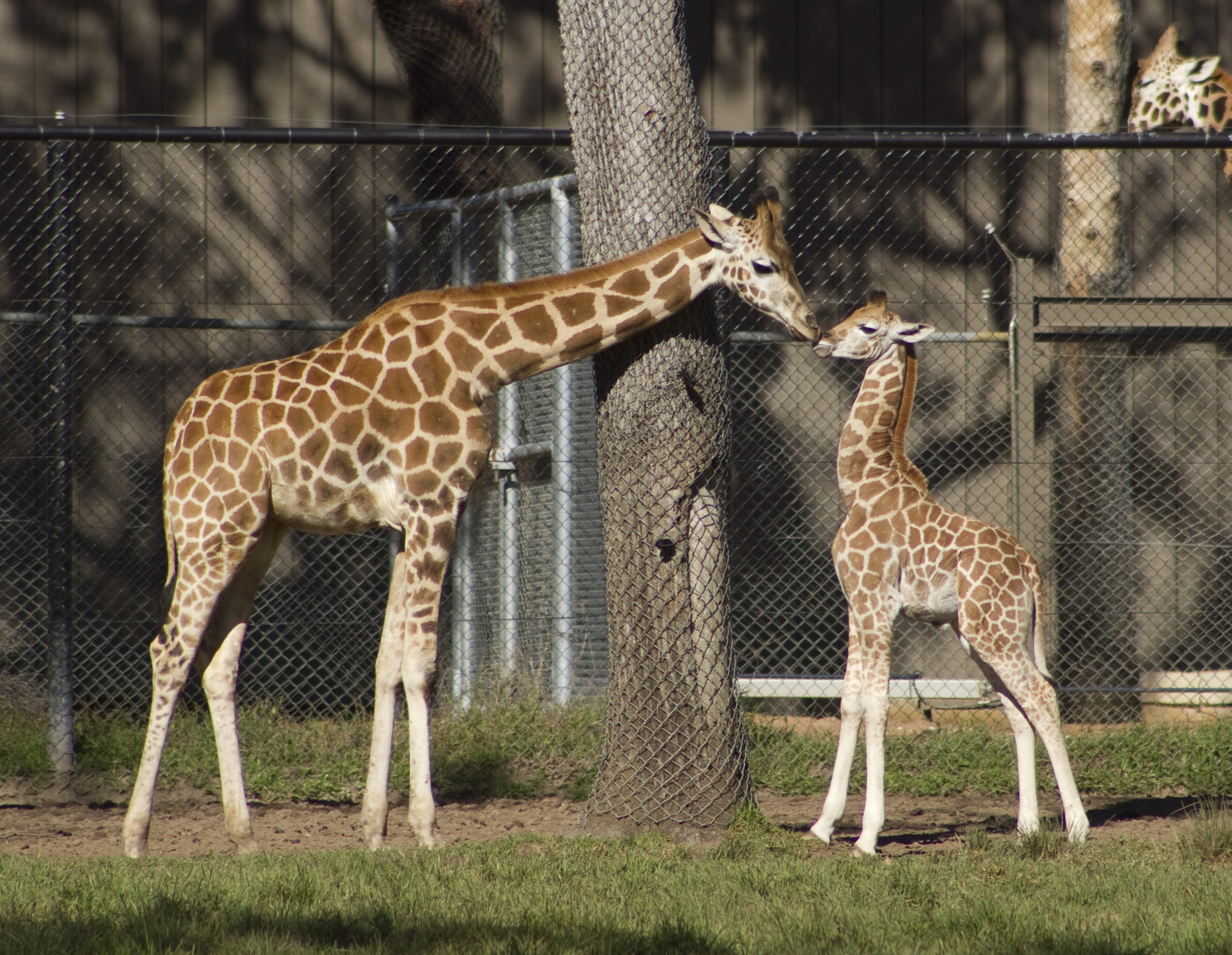
Giraffes

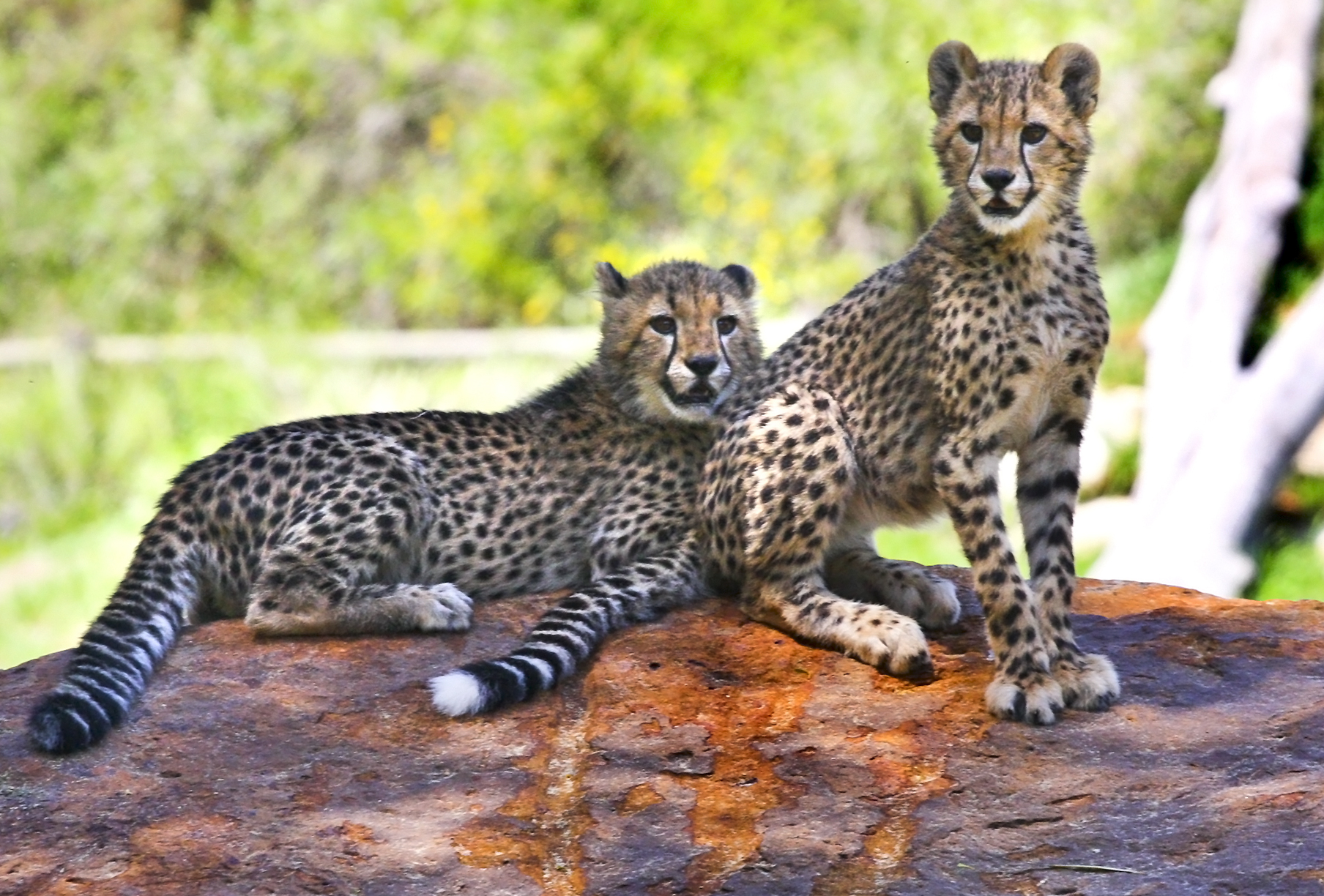
Southeast African cheetahs

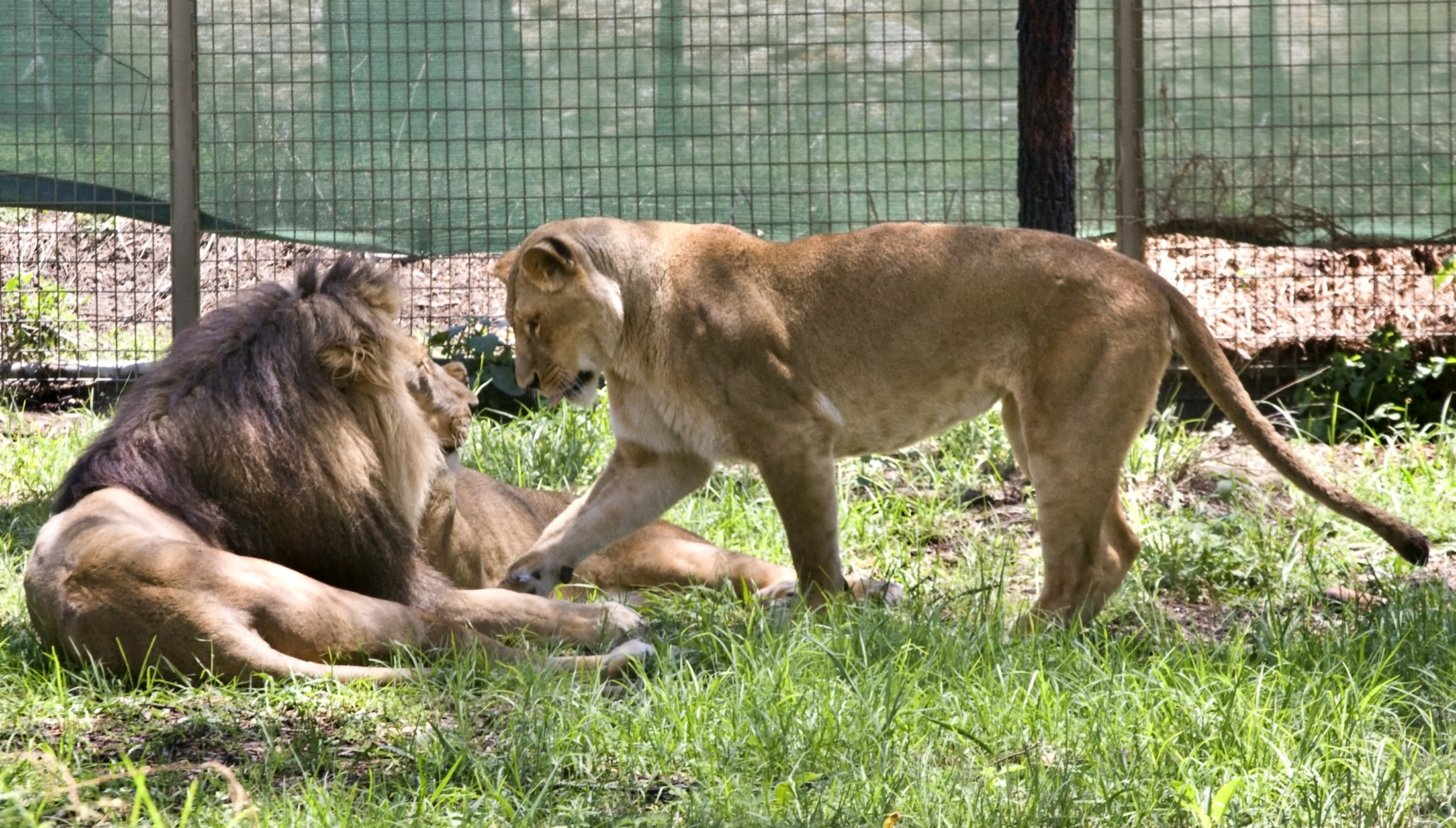
African lions

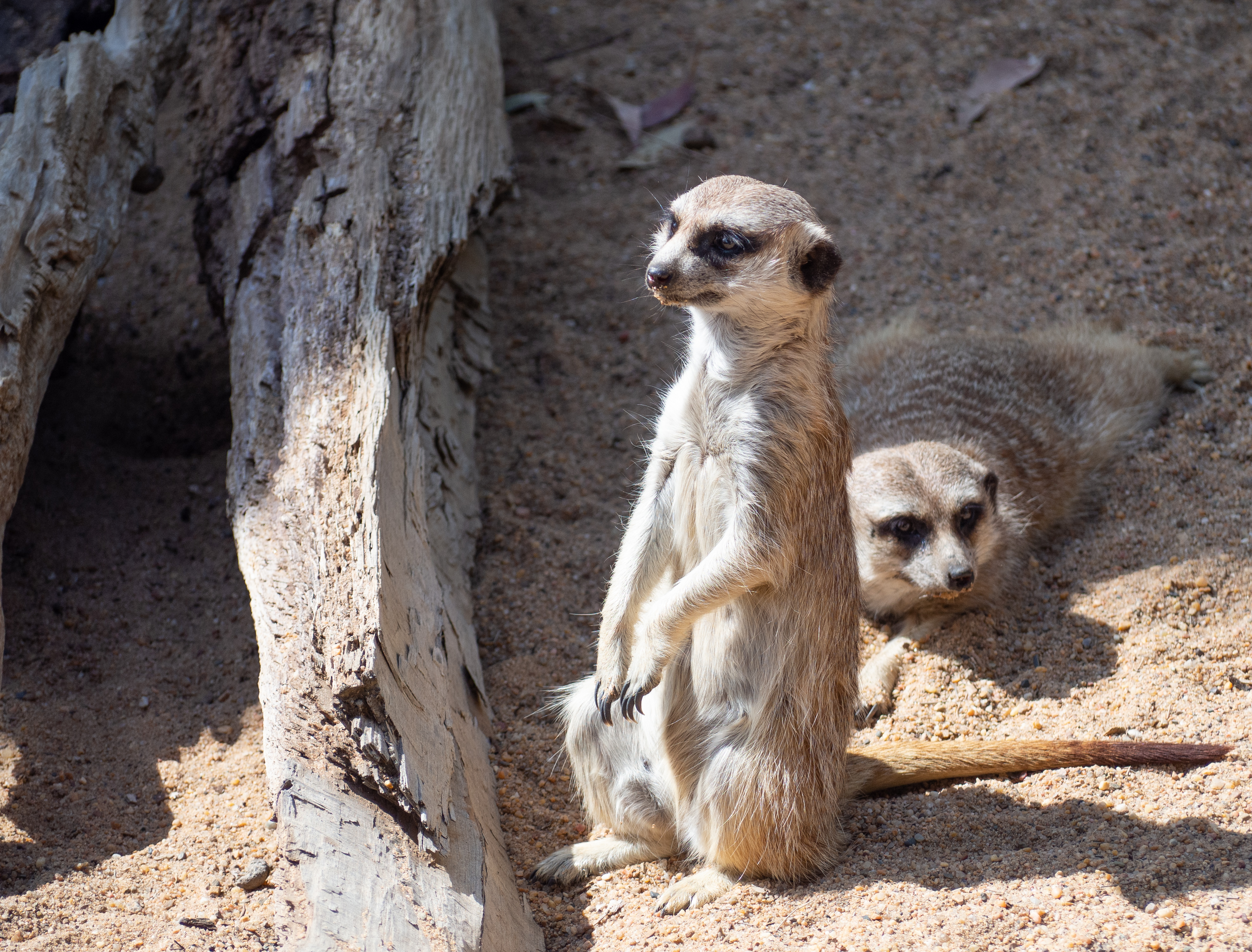
Meerkats

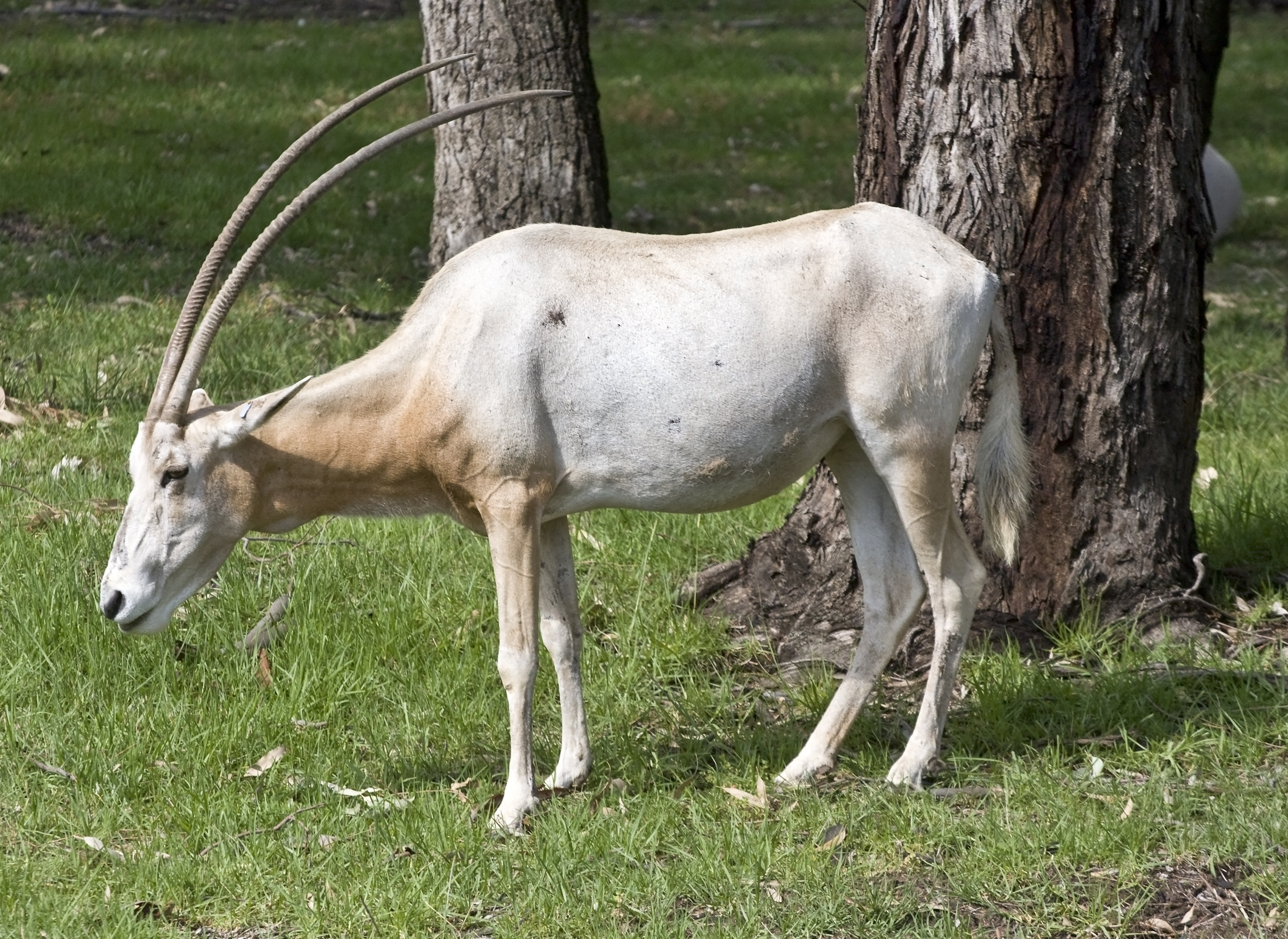
Scimitar oryx

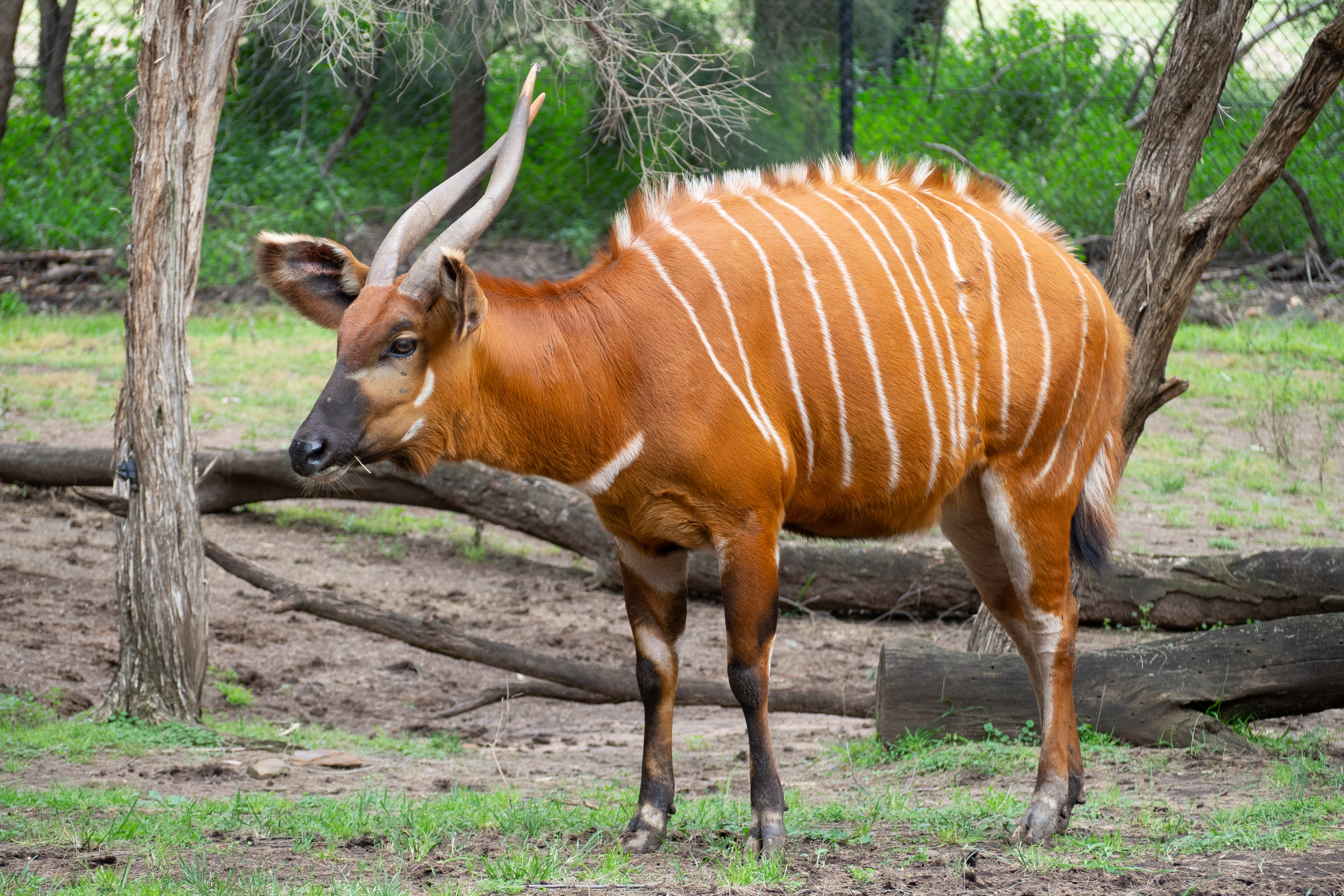
Bongo

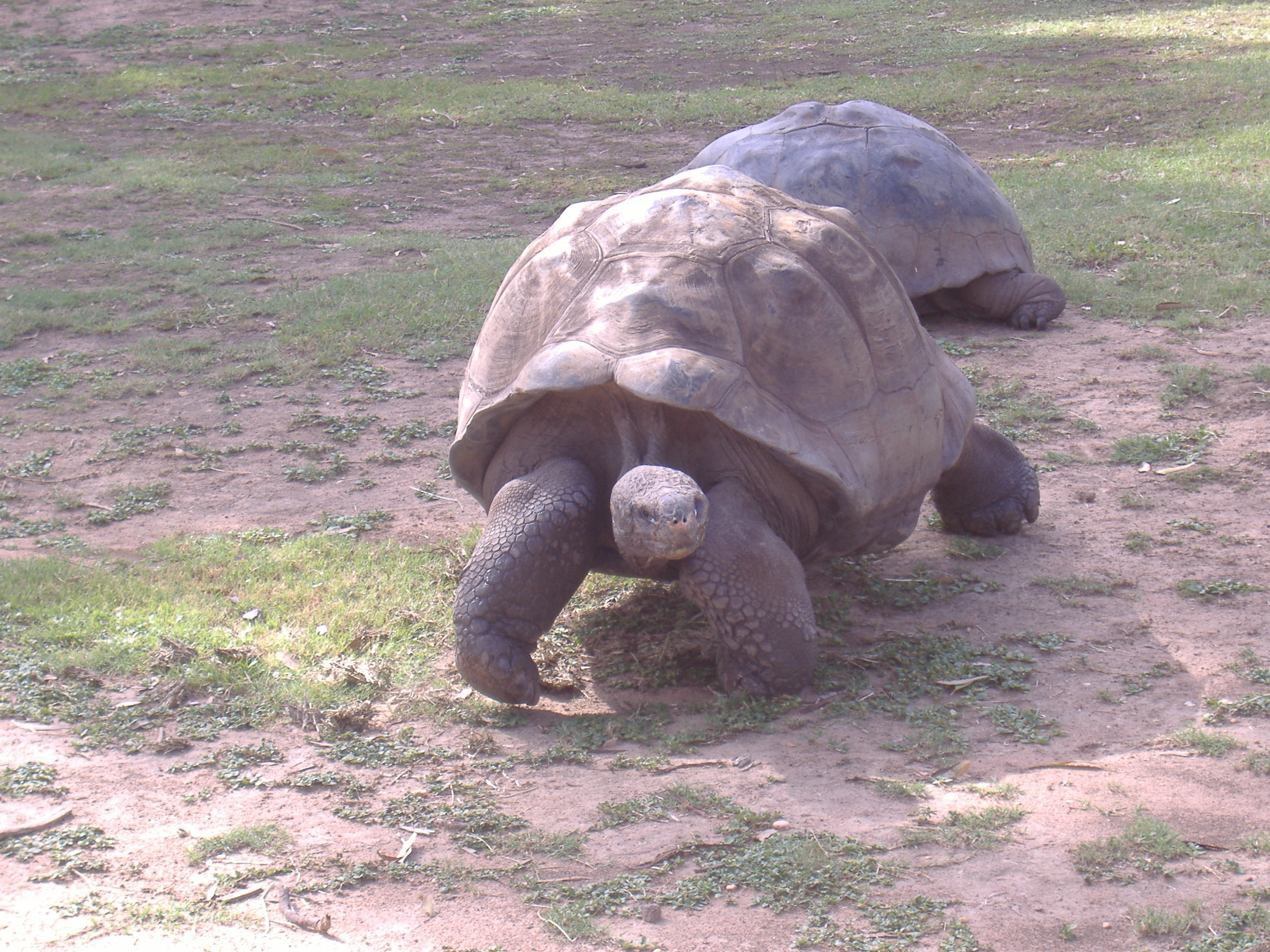
Galápagos tortoises

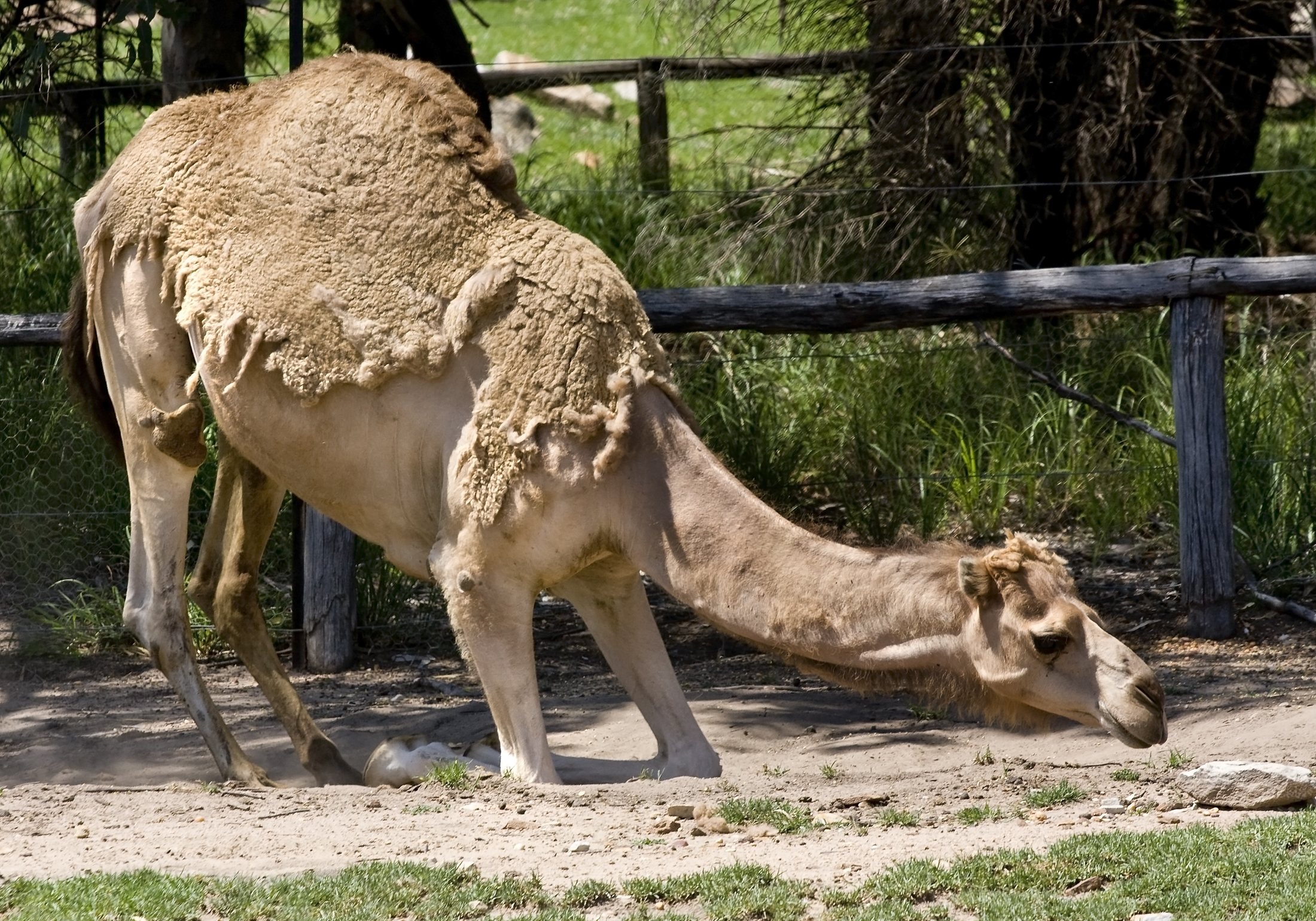
Dromedary camel

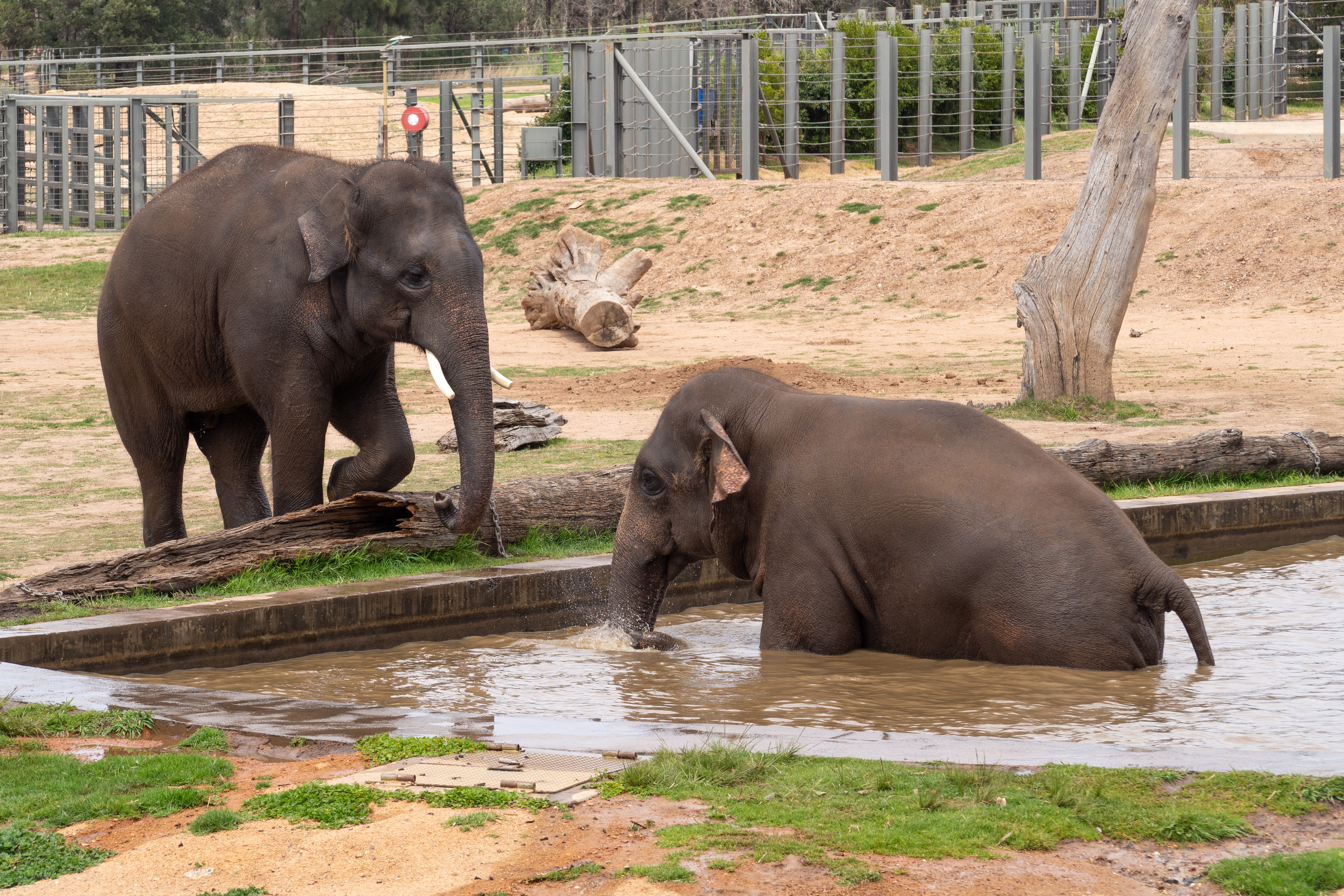
Asian mainland elephants

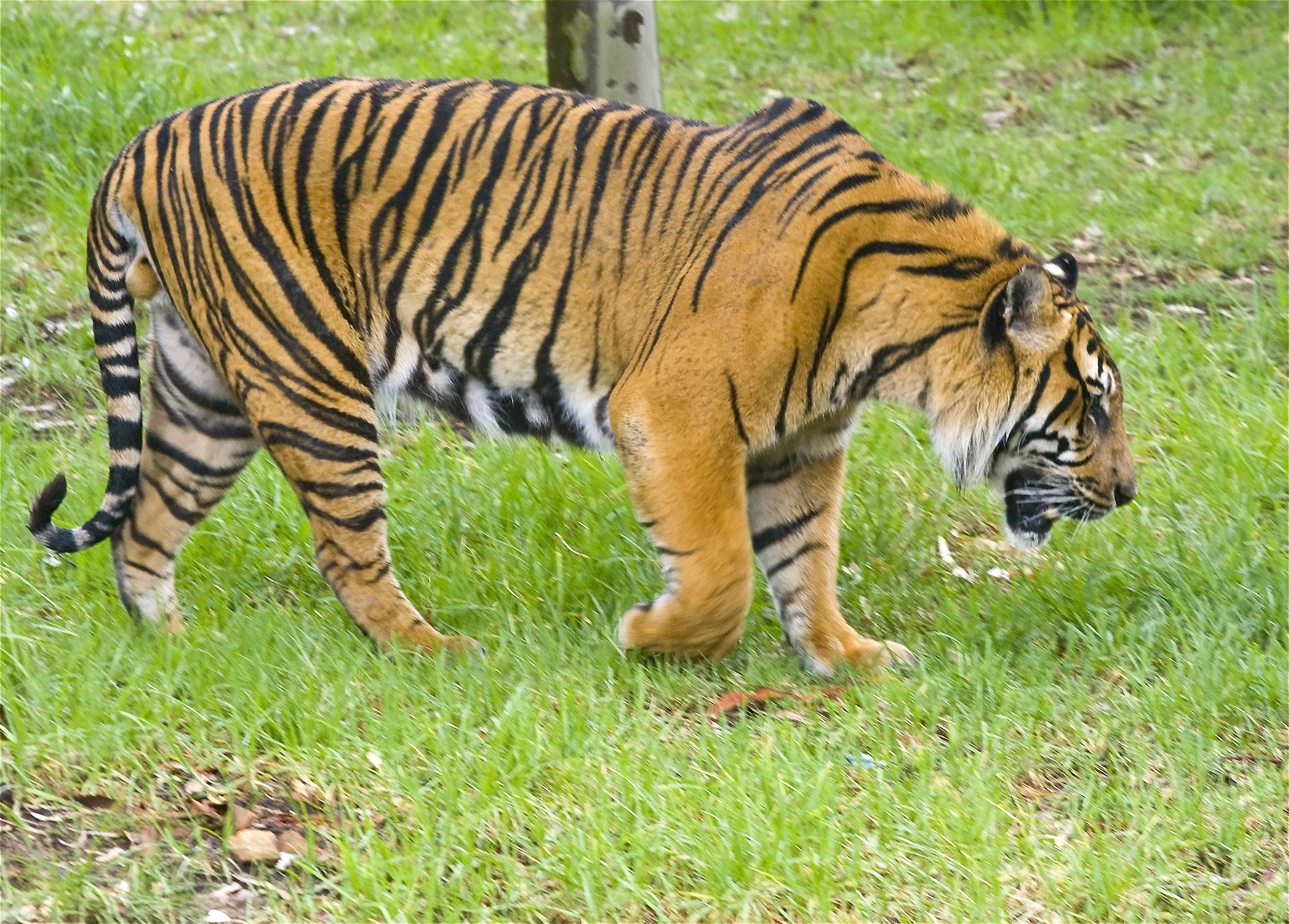
Sumatran tiger

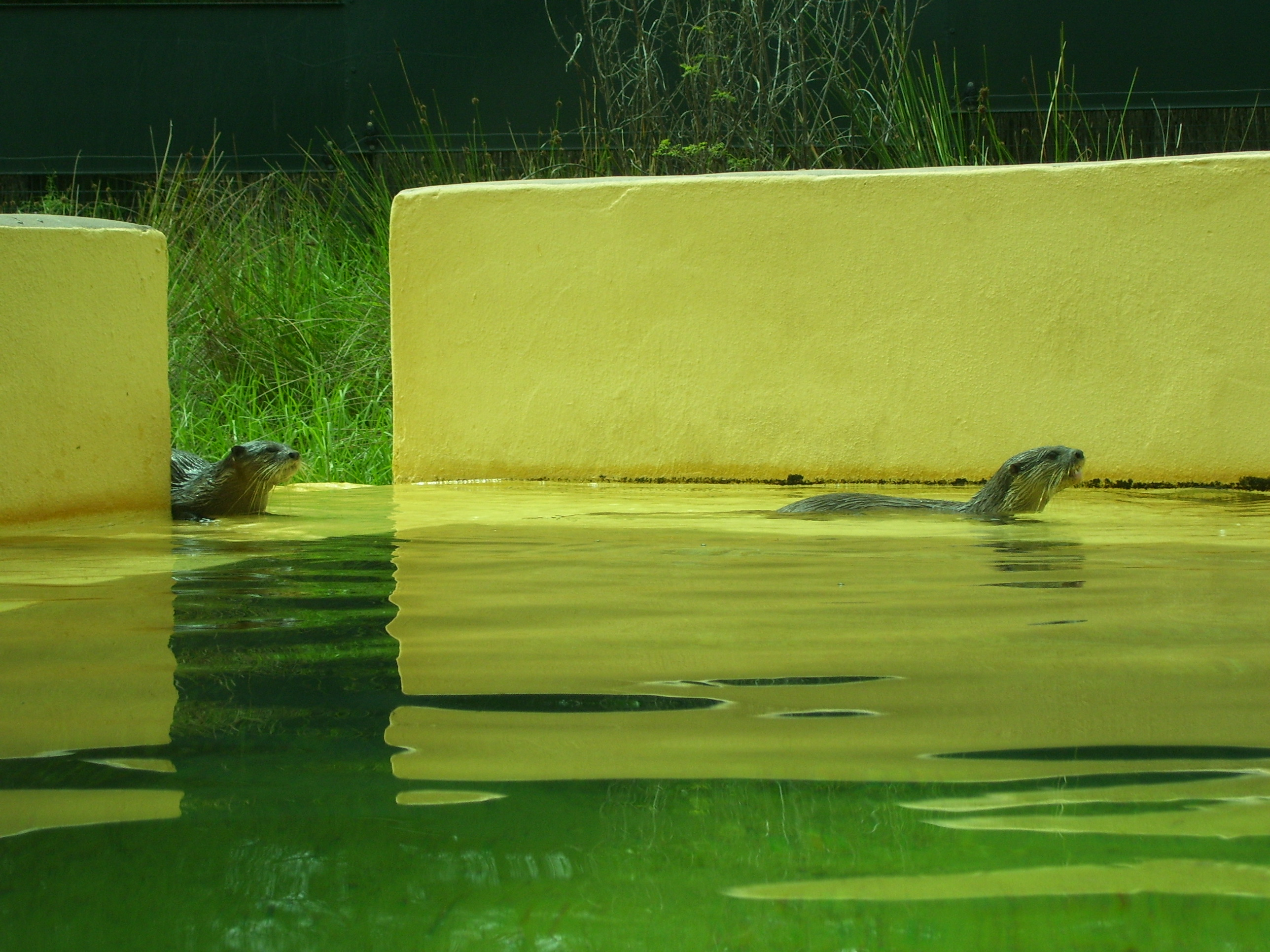
Asian small-clawed otter

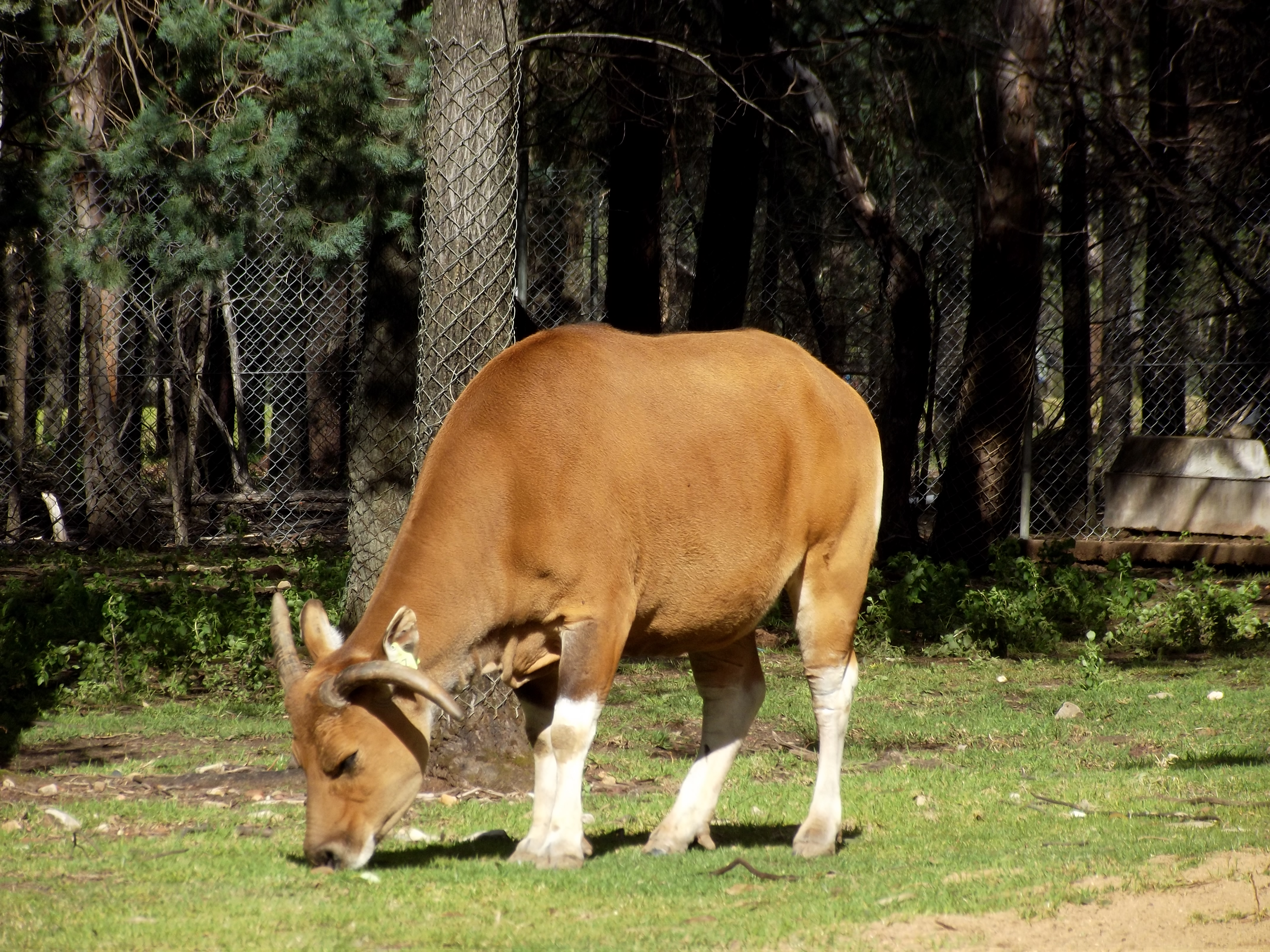
Banteng

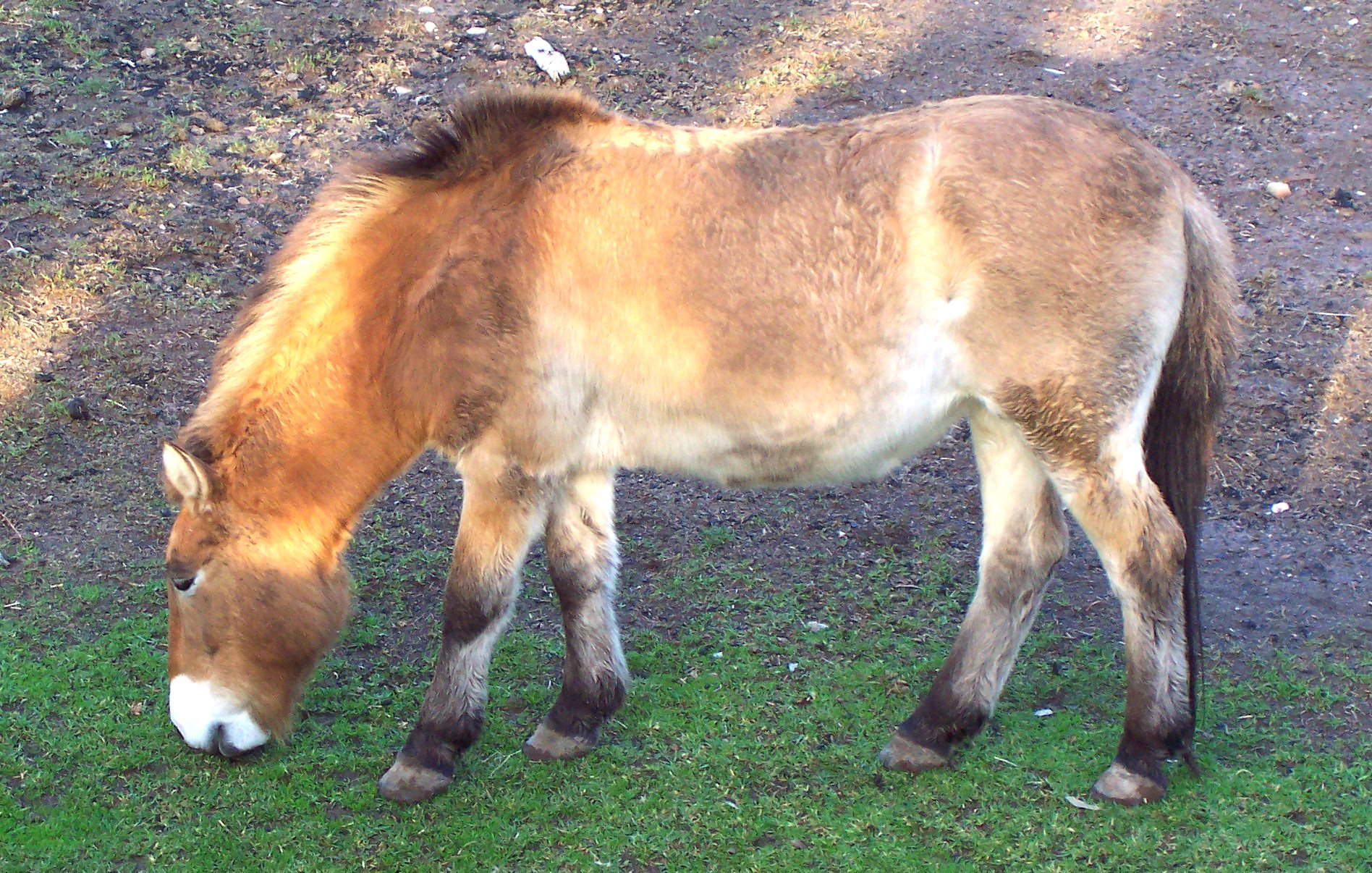
Takhi

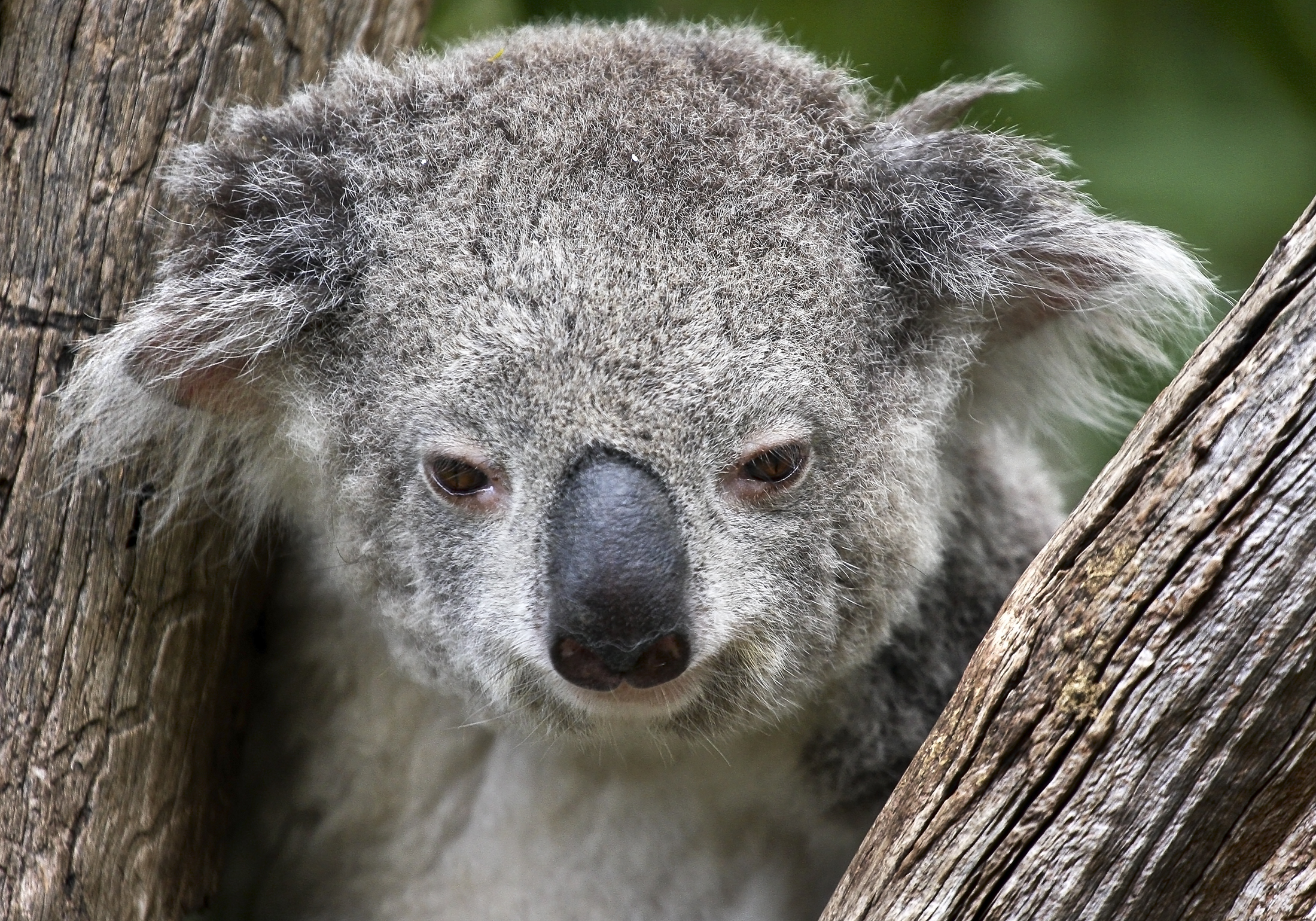
Koala

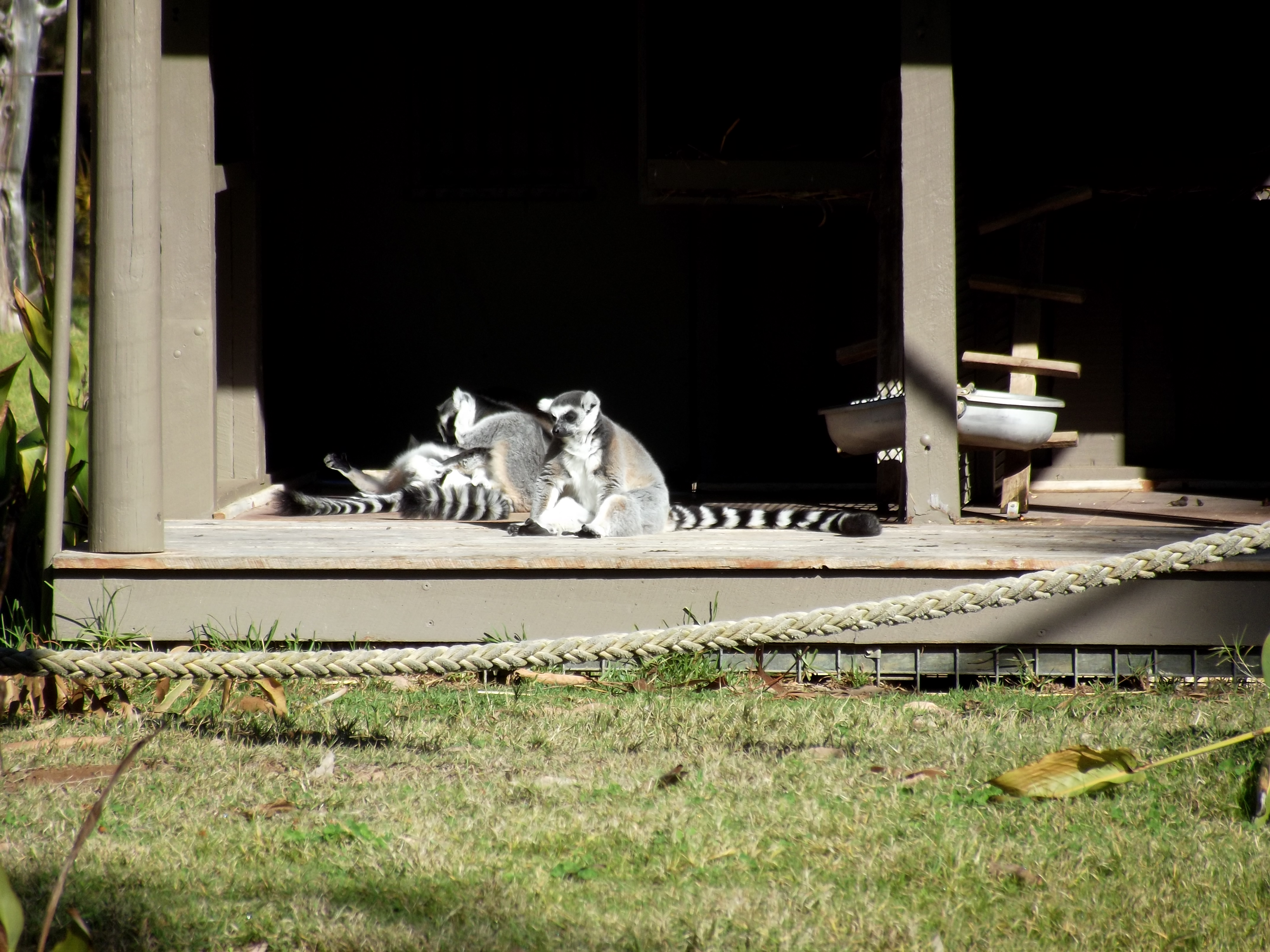
Ring-tailed lemurs

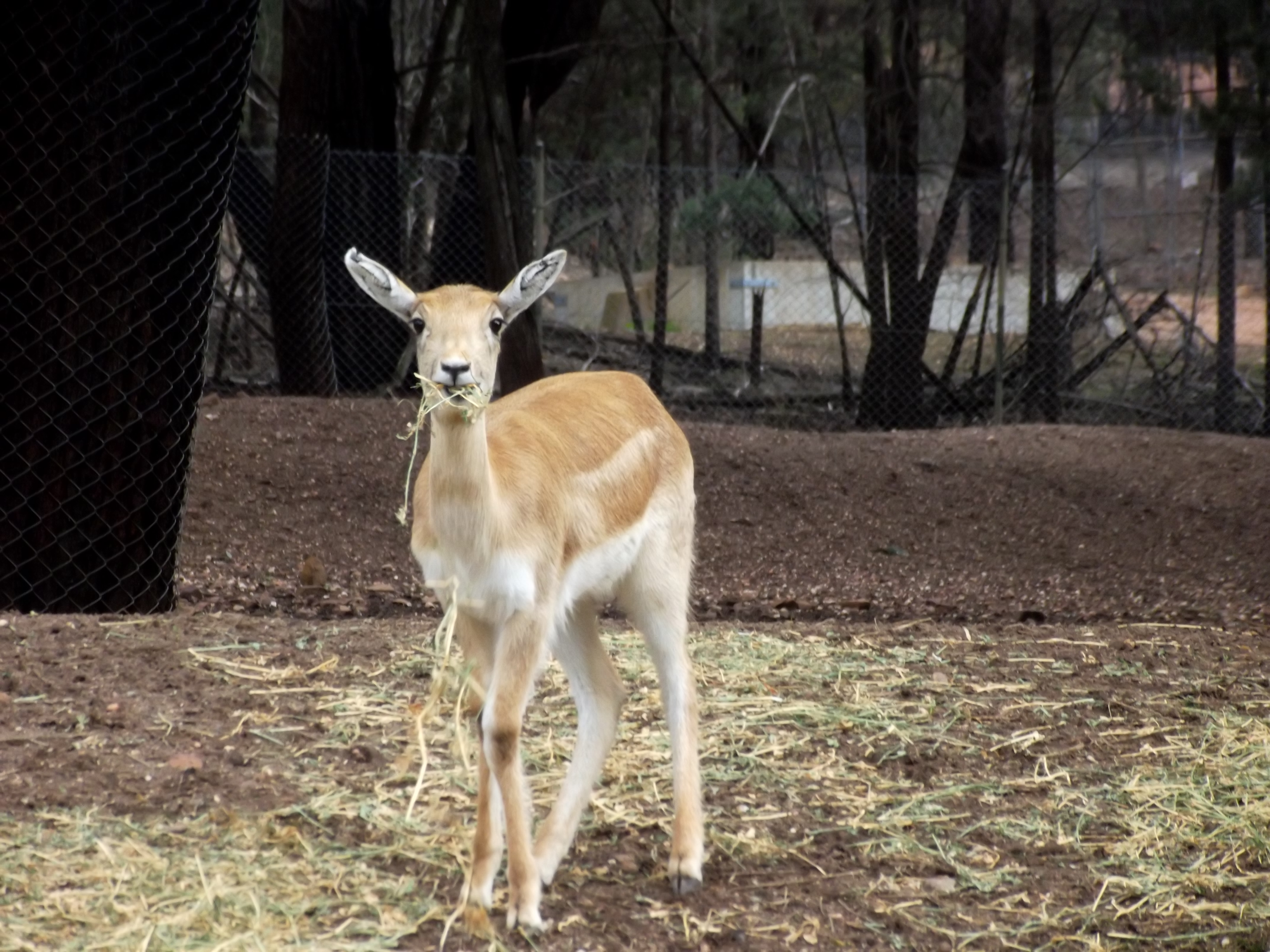
Blackbuck female

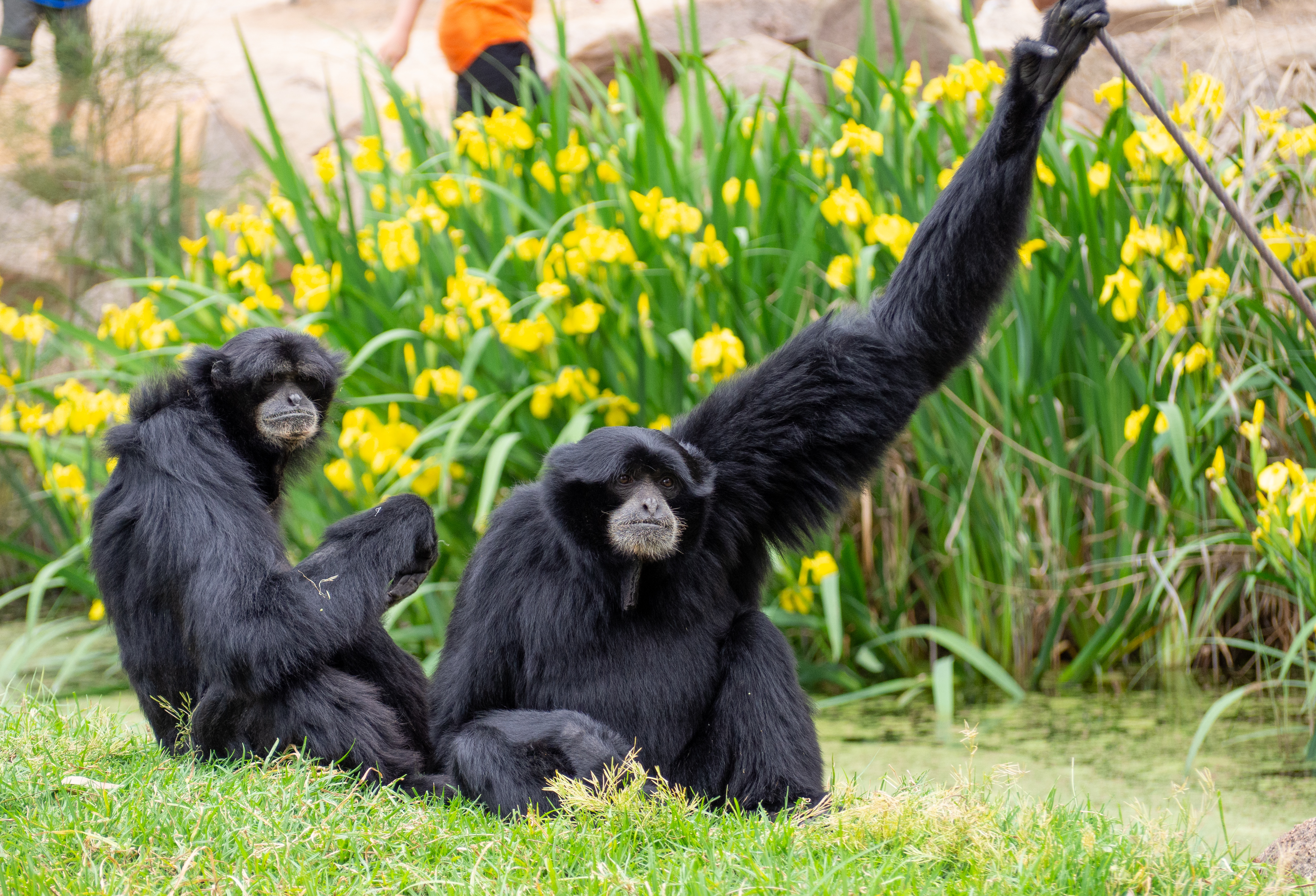
Siamangs

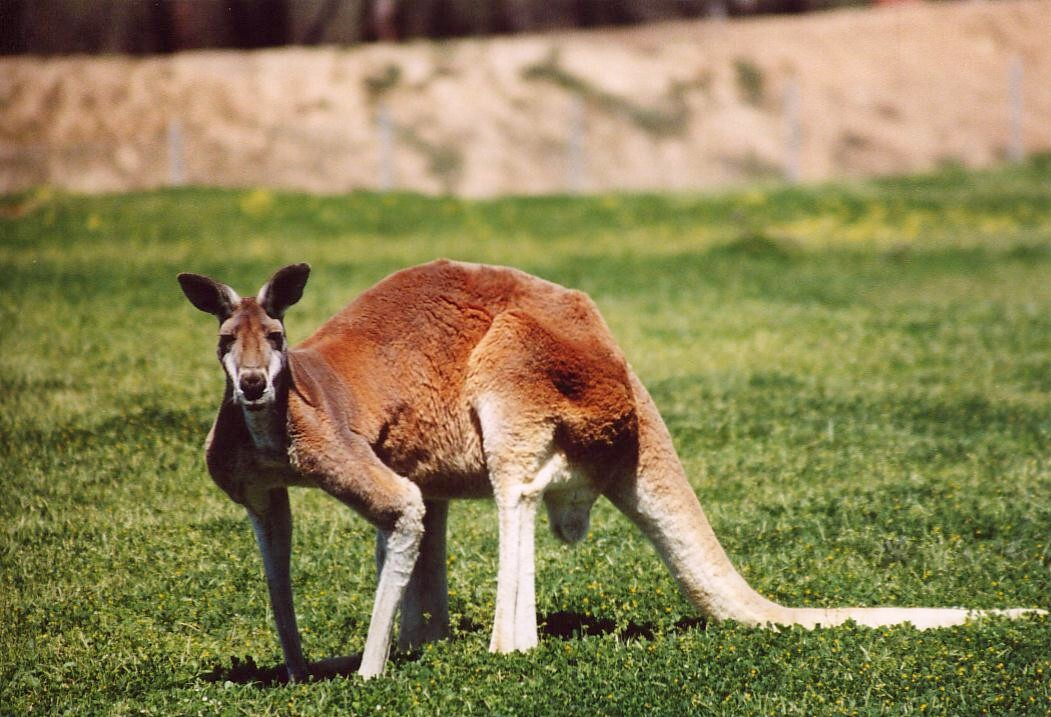
Red kangaroo

== See also ==
- Jim Lacey - General manager of the Western Plains Zoo from 1988 until 1992
- Taronga Zoo Sydney
