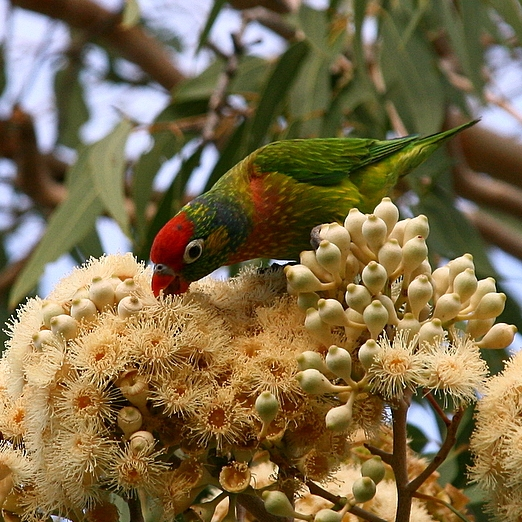
- Varied lorikeet (Psitteuteles versicolor)

Scientific classification
- Kingdom: Animalia
- Phylum: Chordata
- Class: Aves
- Order: Psittaciformes
- Family: Psittaculidae
- Tribe: Loriini
- Genus: Psitteuteles; Bonaparte, 1854

Synonyms
- Parvipsitta Mathews, 1916

= Psitteuteles =

Genus of birds

Psitteuteles is a genus of parrots in the family Psittaculidae. The three species in the genus are native to Australia.

== Taxonomy ==
The genus Psitteuteles was introduced in 1854 by the French naturalist Charles Lucien Bonaparte who listed several species in the genus but did not specify the type species. In 1855 George Gray designated the type as Psittacus versicolor Vigors (i.e. Psittacus versicolor Lear), the varied lorikeet. The genus name is from the binomial Psittacus euteles that the Dutch zoologist Coenraad Jacob Temminck had introduced in 1835 for the olive-headed lorikeet. This species is now placed in the genus Trichoglossus.

The genus contains three species:

Image	Common name	Scientific name	Distribution
	Varied lorikeet	Psitteuteles versicolor	northern Australia (Kimberley region, northern Western Australia, eastward to southwestern Cape York Peninsula, southern Queensland)
	Little lorikeet	Psitteuteles pusillus	eastern and southeastern Australia (Wet Tropics region, southern Queensland, southward to southeastern South Australia)
	Purple-crowned lorikeet	Psitteuteles porphyrocephalus	southern Australia (southwestern Western Australia, southern South Australia including Kangaroo Island, western Victoria, and south-western New South Wales)
