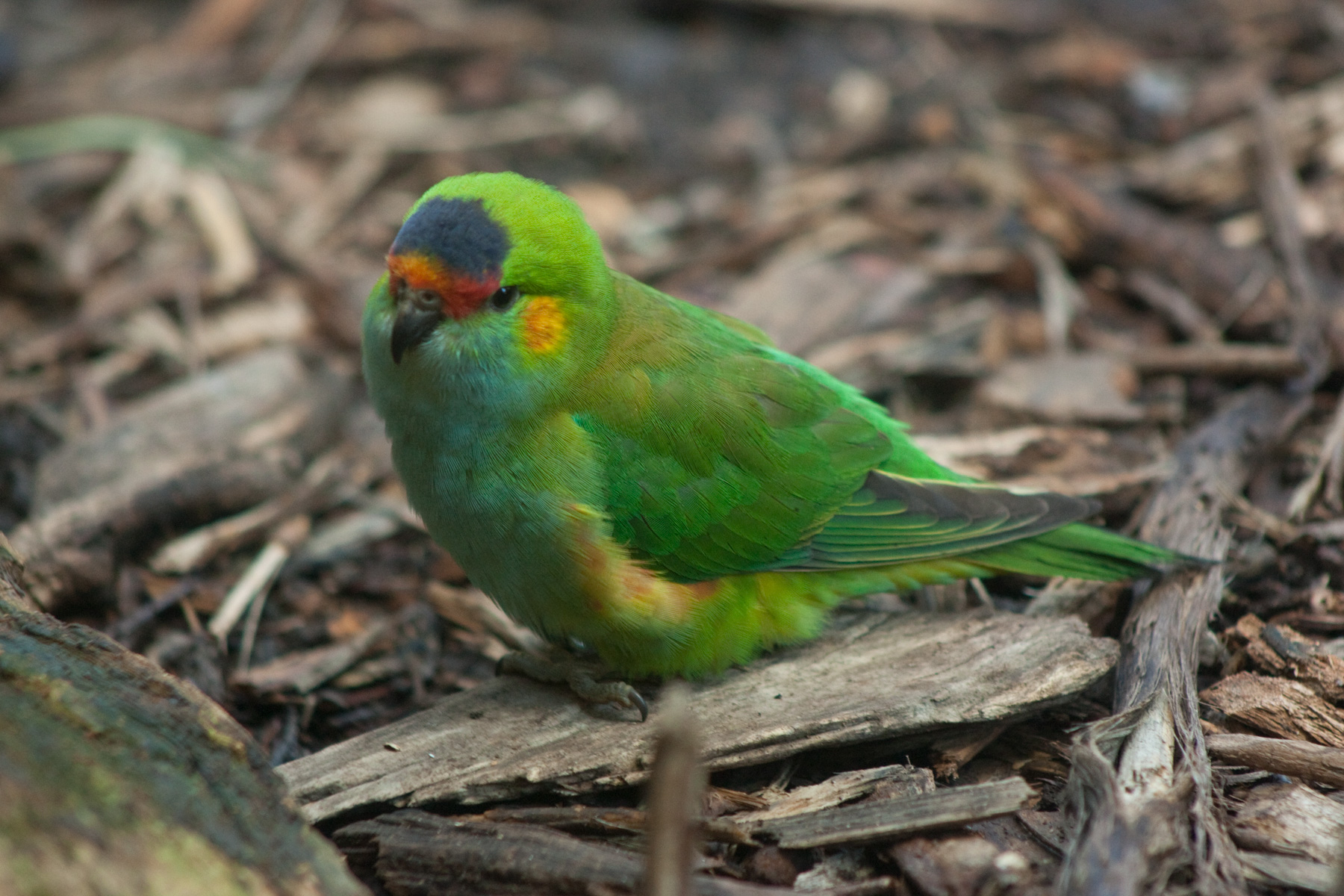
- Purple-crowned lorikeet

Conservation status
- Least Concern (IUCN 3.1)

Scientific classification
- Kingdom: Animalia
- Phylum: Chordata
- Class: Aves
- Order: Psittaciformes
- Family: Psittaculidae
- Genus: Psitteuteles
- Species: P. porphyrocephalus

Binomial name
- Psitteuteles porphyrocephalus (Dietrichsen, 1837)
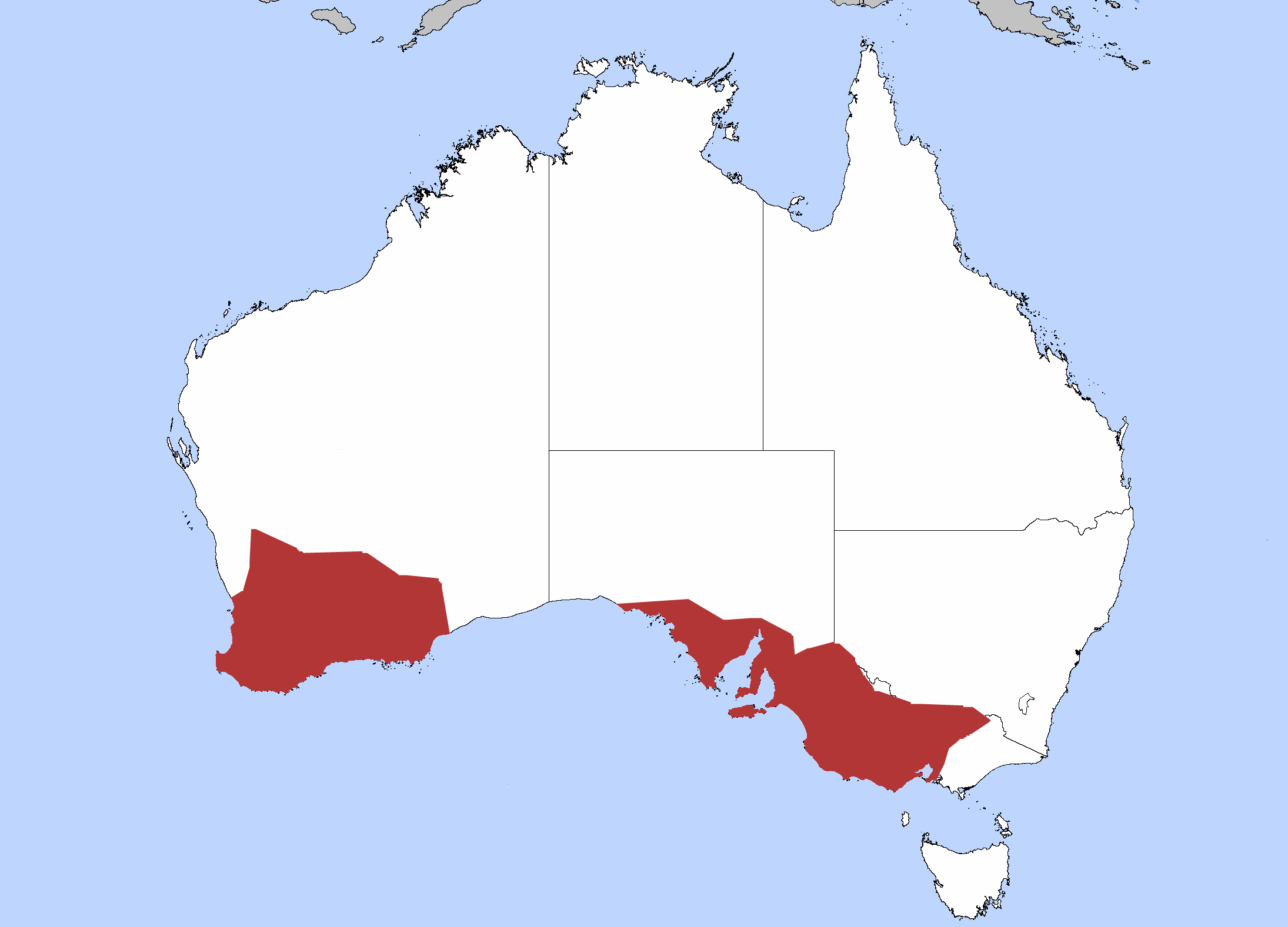
- Distribution of the purple-crowned lorikeet

Synonyms
- Glossopsitta porphyrocephala; Parvipsitta porphyrocephala

= Purple-crowned lorikeet =

Species of bird

The purple-crowned lorikeet (Psitteuteles porphyrocephalus), (also known as the porphyry-crowned lorikeet, zit parrot, blue-crowned lorikeet, purple-capped lorikeet, lory, cowara, lorikeet, and purple-capped parakeet) is a lorikeet found in scrub and mallee of southern Australia. It is a small lorikeet distinguished by a purple crown, an orange forehead and ear-coverts, and a light blue chin and chest.

== Taxonomy ==
The purple-crowned lorikeet was described by Lionel Dietrichsen in 1837 as Trichoglossus porphyrocephalus. His first description in 1832 used the name Psittacus purpureus, a name preoccupied by a description of another species. The specific epithet derived from the Ancient Greek words porphuros "purple" and kephalē "head". Alternate common names include porphyry-crowned lorikeet, Dietrichsen's lory, and Zit parrot, from its shrill call.

== Description ==
Measuring around 15 cm (6 in) long, the male purple-crowned lorikeet is a small lorikeet with a dark purple crown, a yellow-orange forehead and ear-coverts, deepening to orange lores, and green upperparts, tinted bronze on the mantle and nape. The chin, chest and belly are a conspicuous powder blue, while the thighs and under-tail coverts are yellowish-green. The green tail has some orange-red coloration at the bases of the lateral feathers. The large crimson patches under the wings are visible when the bird is in flight. The small beak is black, the iris brown and the feet grey. The female is similar but has a darker iris, paler ear coverts and lacks the crimson patches. Immature birds are duller and lack the purple crown. Its call is a high-pitched loud tsit, as well as chattering while eating in treetops. Its call is lower pitched than the little lorikeet but higher than the musk lorikeet.

== Distribution and habitat ==
The purple-crowned lorikeet is found in southwest Western Australia, and in southern South Australia, east from the southern Eyre Peninsula, through the Gawler Ranges and southern Flinders Ranges and across Victoria to East Gippsland. It is also found on Kangaroo Island, but is not found in Tasmania. It is the only native lorikeet found in Western Australia.

Locally nomadic, it is often found in dry sclerophyll forest and town parks and gardens, especially where Eucalyptus trees are flowering.

== Behaviour ==
Generally found in small groups, the species may congregate in larger flocks, and may be in the company of Little- and musk lorikeets. It is a fast, straight flyer and dwells mainly in the forest canopy far above the ground.

=== Feeding ===
The lorikeet is a gregarious blossom nomad that often reappears in areas where it has not been seen for some time. Blossoms of various Eucalyptus and Melaleuca species, and the boobialla (Myoporum insulare) are among material consumed.

=== Breeding ===
Breeding season is from August to December with one brood laid. The nest is a small unlined hollow in eucalypt, often with a knot-hole entrance. Sometimes the species nests in colonies. A clutch of 2–4 matte white roundish eggs, measuring 20 x 17 mm, is laid. The incubation period is around 17 days.

== Aviculture ==
Captive purple-crowned lorikeets have had a reputation for being short-lived. It is uncommonly seen in captivity outside Australia.

== Gallery ==
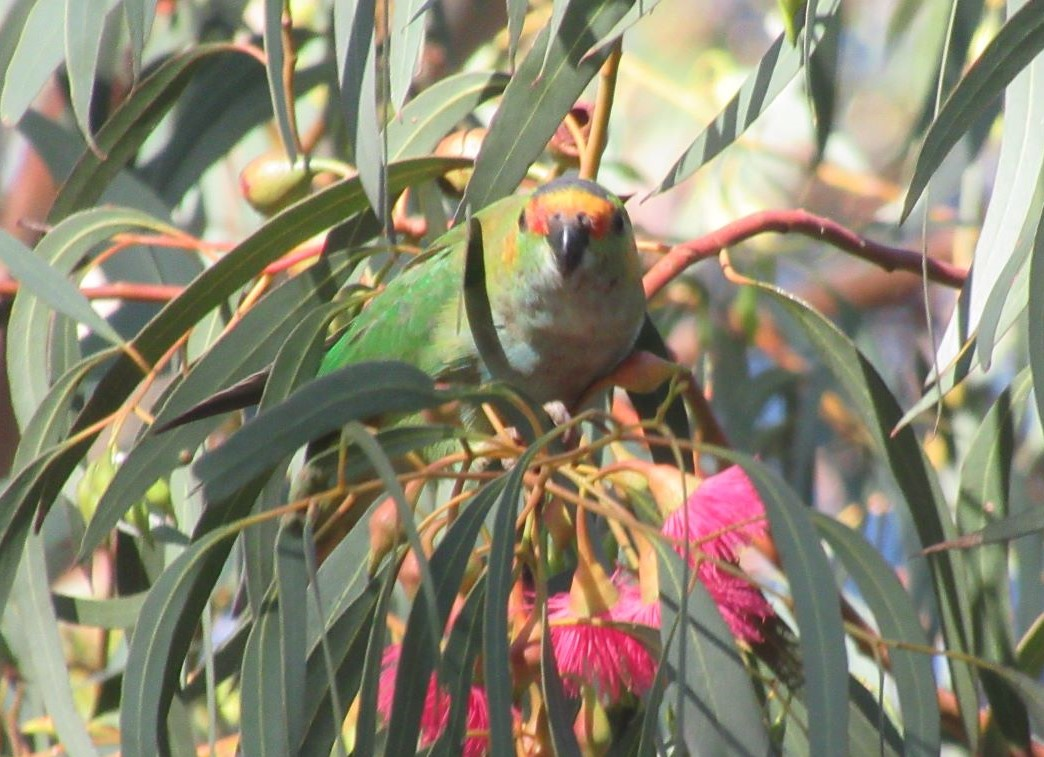
Purple-crowned Lorikeet, Port Augusta, South Australia

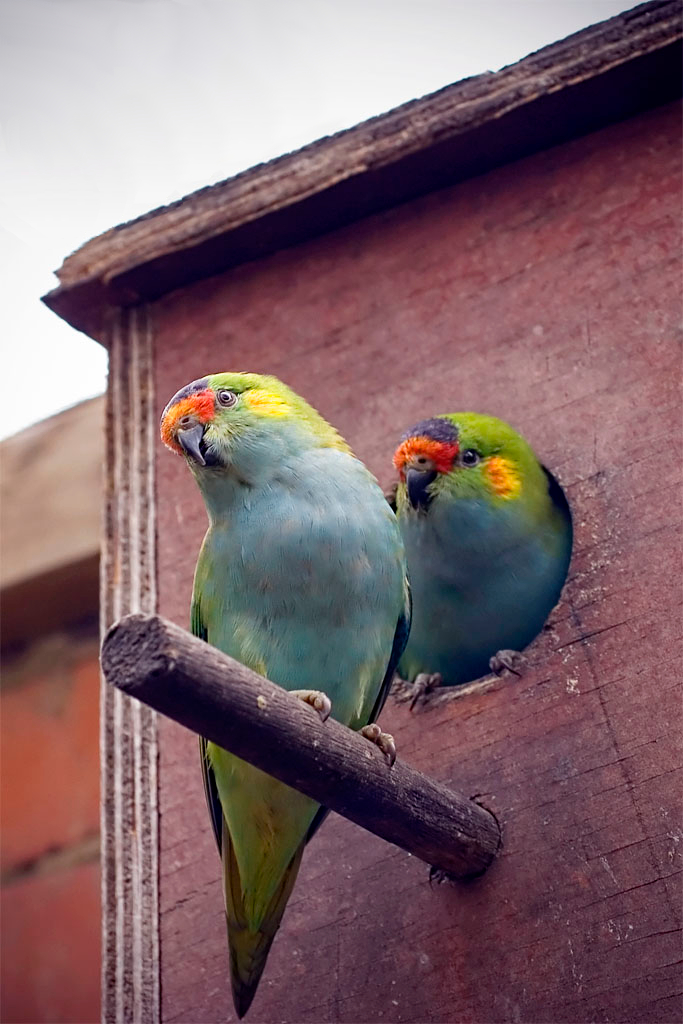
At Rainbow Jungle,
Kalbarri, Western Australia

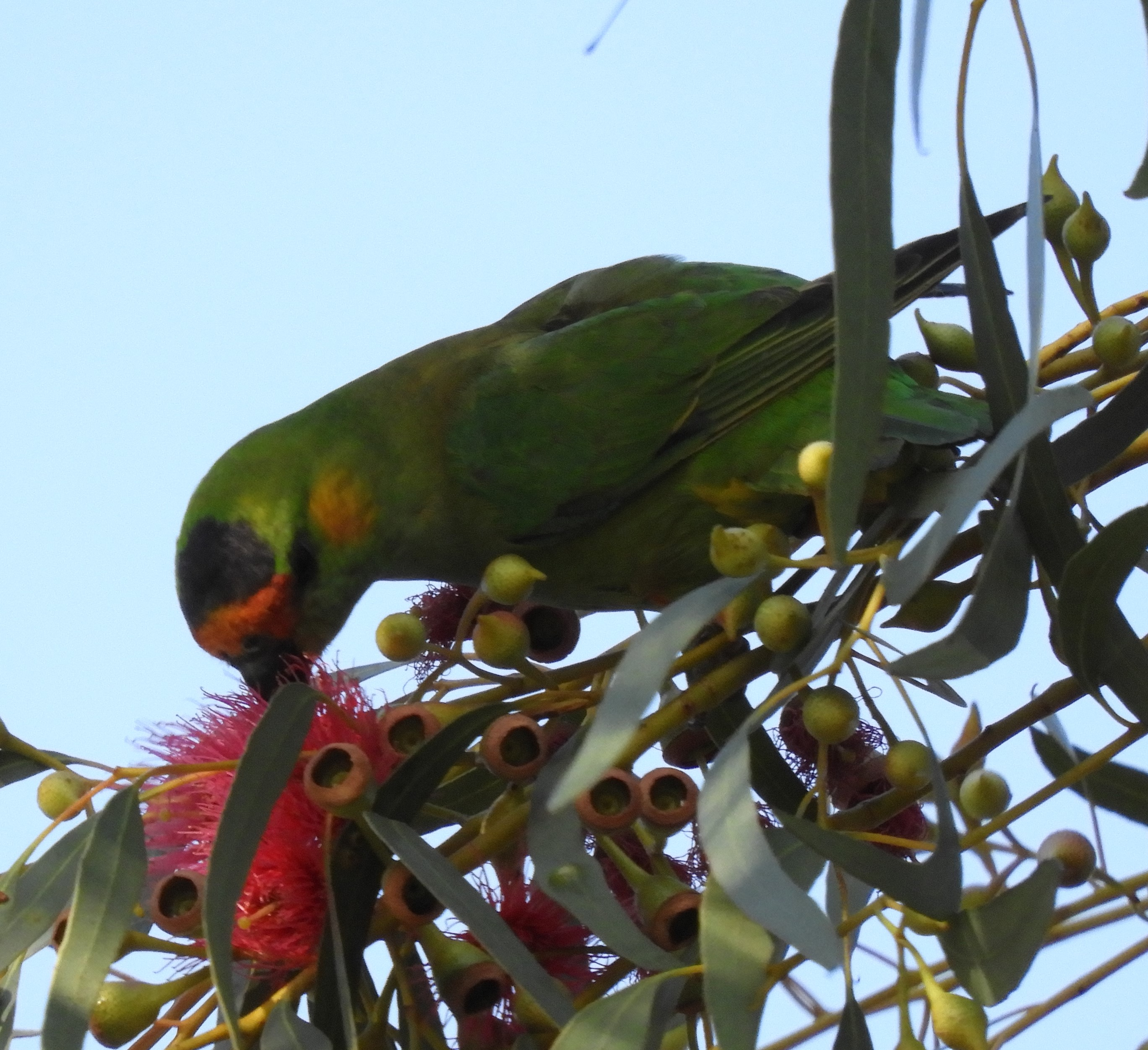
Purple-crowned lorikeet, Port Augusta, South Australia

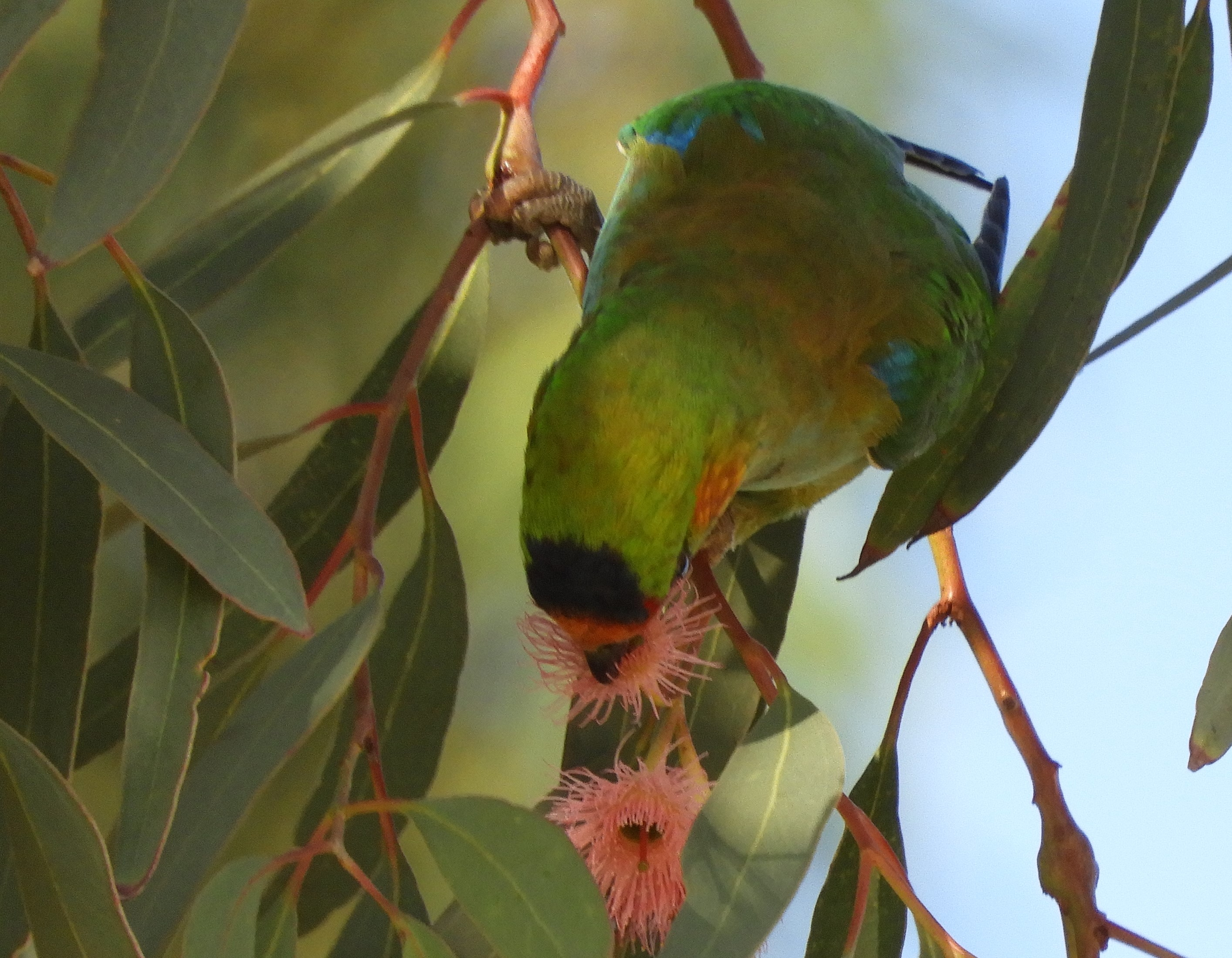
Purple-crowned lorikeet, Port Augusta, South Australia
