= Jim Lacey =

Australian zoo manager (1934–2008)

James Francis Lacey (5 June 1934 – 31 January 2008) was an Australian whose work was considered instrumental in the development of the Western Plains Zoo in Dubbo, New South Wales, as its general manager from 1988 to 1992. Lacey also served as the administrator of Lord Howe Island beginning in 1983.

== Early life ==
Lacey was born in Sydney, Australia, in 1934. He resided in the city until he was 29 years old. He moved to Young, New South Wales, with his wife, Judith, and their oldest daughter, Elizabeth, in 1963.

The family moved again in 1971, this time to the city of Wagga Wagga. There, Lacey was employed as a Regional Development Officer for The Riverina.

== Career ==
Jim Lacey was appointed the administrator of Lord Howe Island in 1983 by the Department of the NSW Government of the Premier of New South Wales, Neville Wran. Lacey was praised for his work as administrator of the island, which is a territory within New South Wales.

Lacey's work on Lord Howe Island was noticed by John Kelly, the chief zoo Director of Parks and Wildlife. Kelly asked Lacey to join the Western Plains Zoo in 1988 as general manager, an offer which Lacey accepted. (The Western Plains Zoo is now called the Taronga Western Plains Zoo). During his time at the zoo, Lacey worked to grow and develop the zoo's facilities, while maintaining an open-range concept for the animals.

Lacey oversaw the introduction of Asiatic lions to the Western Plains Zoo. Another of Lacey's initiatives involved the construction of elevated canopy-level platforms in the zoo's koala exhibit, so visitors could view the koalas at eye level instead of from the ground. Lacey also travelled to Zimbabwe to negotiate the acquisition of several endangered black rhinos. The black rhino breeding program at the Western Plains Zoo is now a well regarded initiative.

Lacey hosted Queen Elizabeth II on her visit to the Western Plains Zoo in 1992. He also aggressively promoted the zoo as a major area tourist attraction.

Lacey voluntarily left the zoo in 1992. Lacey moved to Darwin, Australia, where he took a position at the Northern Territory Wildlife Park for two years and developed a similar open range concept for the animals of that zoo as well.

Lacey and his wife later moved to Coffs Harbour. He served as the New Business Development Manager on the local council until his retirement in 2004. He moved to Woonona upon his retirement.

== Death ==
Jim Lacey died on 31 January 2008, at a hospital near Wollongong at the age of 73. He was survived by his wife, Judith, and their five children: Elizabeth Hirst, Mary Louise Lacey, Catherine McClintock, Andrew Lacey and Anne Lacey.

Lacey's funeral was held at St Joseph's Catholic Church in Bulli.
