= Zoo Friends =

Australian not-for-profit organisation

Zoo Friends provides assistance to Sydney's Taronga Zoo and Dubbo's Western Plains Zoo as a not-for-profit organisation. Over two million dollars were raised in 2005 in support of the Zoos and conservation and education strategies. In 2009, the total membership of the Association of Zoo Friends was over 62,000.

Started in 1983 with the goal to provide financial and volunteer help to both Taronga and Western Plains Zoos, Zoo Friends has a governing body with elected and appointed members. Elections are held annually, and all adult financial members are eligible to vote and to run for office.

Funds are raised by membership subscriptions and educational activities. Zoo Friends membership subscriptions contribute to zoological conservation and education projects. Fifty per cent of membership subscription fees goes automatically to Taronga and Western Plains Zoo. This amounted to $1.3 million in 2008. In addition to this fifty percent, $10.00 of every subscription also goes directly to the Taronga Foundation in support of the Zoological Parks Board's master plan.

The remainder of subscription monies, after operating expenses are met, is returned to the zoos in the form of grants for the Zoos' conservation and educational projects. They can vary from funding for new animal enclosures, animal enrichment equipment and projects to Zoo Friends' fellowships. Zoo Friends have donated over $13 million.

Zoo Friends has over 460 volunteers at both Taronga and Western Plains Zoos. They give over 60,000 hours of dedicated service each year. This represents an estimated yearly contribution of $1.8 million based on average employment costs. Volunteers help the zoos in a wide variety of areas, including service providers and educational facilitators.
