= Lionel Dietrichsen =

English ornithologist

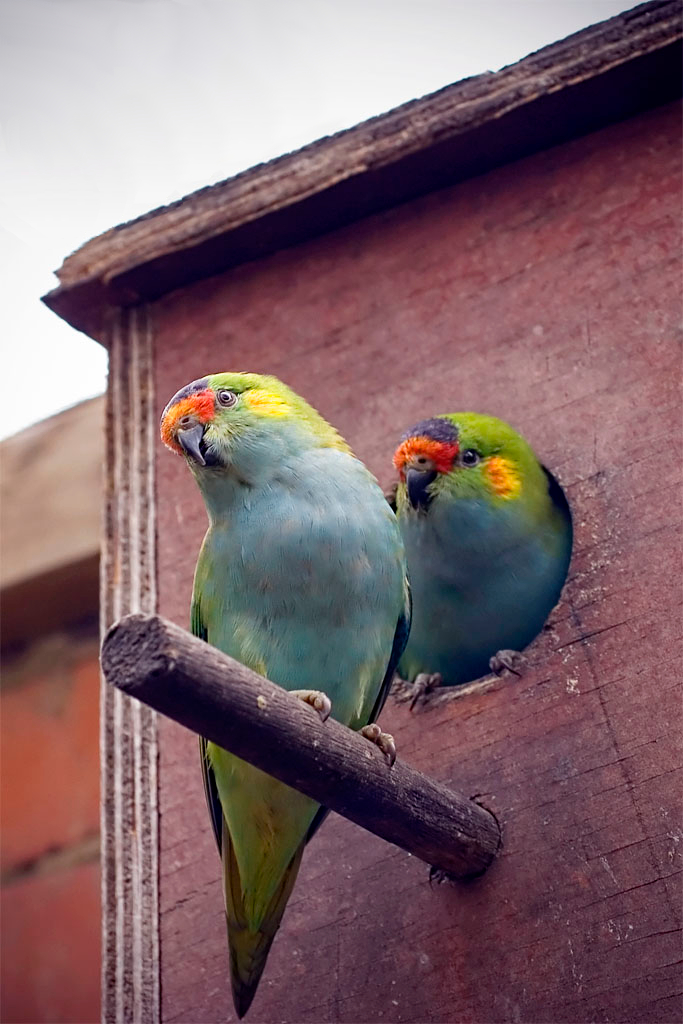
A pair of purple-crowned lorikeets (Parvipsitta porphyrocephala), which Dietrichsen described in 1837.

Lionel Lorenzo Dietrichsen (1806–1846) was an English ornithologist who operated as a merchant at Oxford Street. He collected bird skins and described the species Parvipsitta porphyrocephala, which is known as Dietrichsen's lory, in 1832. He died, unmarried, reportedly by nearly severing his own head.
