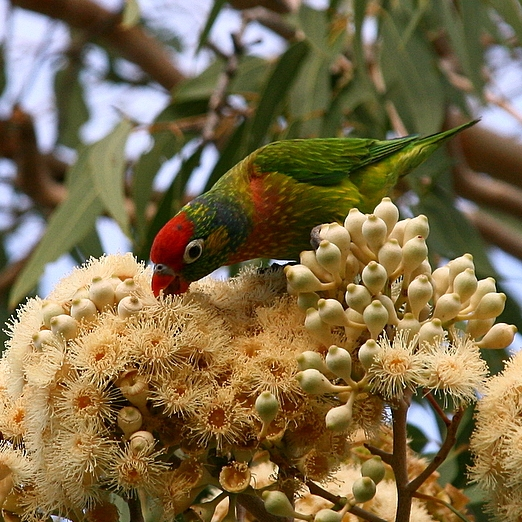
- In Queensland, Australia

Conservation status
- Least Concern (IUCN 3.1)

Scientific classification
- Kingdom: Animalia
- Phylum: Chordata
- Class: Aves
- Order: Psittaciformes
- Family: Psittaculidae
- Tribe: Loriini
- Genus: Psitteuteles
- Species: P. versicolor

Binomial name
- Psitteuteles versicolor (Lear, 1831)

= Varied lorikeet =

Species of bird

The varied lorikeet (Psitteuteles versicolor), is a species of parrot in the family Psittaculidae that is endemic to the northern coastal regions of Australia.

== Taxonomy ==
The first depiction of the species was included in a seminal folio by Edward Lear, the subject of his illustration has since been lost and it became recognised as the holotype. The image was published as the thirty sixth lithographic plate in September 1831, without a location or description, in his work Illustrations of the Family of Psittacidae, or Parrots (1830–32) depicting live specimens in English zoological exhibitions and private collections. The name supplied in the caption was Trichoglossus versicolor, with the subheading "Variegated Parrakeet". The source of the specimen, according to Richard Schodde (1997), was incorrectly determined as "Cape York", a location proposed by Gregory Mathews in 1912 and subsequently repeated. Schodde reports the absence of records at that location, instead drawing attention the surveys of Admiral King along the Northwest coastline from Arnhem Land to King Sound and settlements in 1824, Fort Dundas at Melville Island, and the 1827 Fort Wellington at Raffles Bay, and giving this region as the likely source of the collection.

The varied lorikeet is now placed in the genus Psitteuteles that was introduced by the French ornithologist Charles Lucien Bonaparte in 1854. The species is monotypic: no subspecies are recognised.

== Description ==
The varied lorikeet is about 19 centimetres (7.5 in) long. It is mainly green with short yellow longitudinal streaks. The fine yellow streaking and broad orbital patch are distinctive. The lores, forehead, and crown are red. The beak is red, the bare eye-rings are white, the lores are bare, and the irises are orange-yellow. The upper breast is mauve with longitudinal yellow streaks. The legs are bluish-grey. In the female the red on the head is less extensive, and the breast has duller colours. Juveniles are much duller and are mainly green with an orange forehead, pale-brown irises, and a brown beak that is orange at the base. Its flight is swift and direct and contact call is a distinct shrill screech. The call is given constantly in flight and flocks are often heard before they are seen. The varied lorikeet is a blossom nomad.

== Distribution and habitat ==
The varied lorikeet lives in tropical eucalypt forests, wetland and grassland areas in northern Queensland, Northern Territory and Western Australia. it Ranges from Broome in WA across into the Gulf (NT), south to Mount Isa and north to the Jardine River in Queensland.

== Breeding ==
The varied lorikeet mates in April–August and will lay 2–4 white eggs in a unlined tree hollow, often horizontal limbs. The lorikeet also uses these horizontal branches to roost.

== Gallery ==
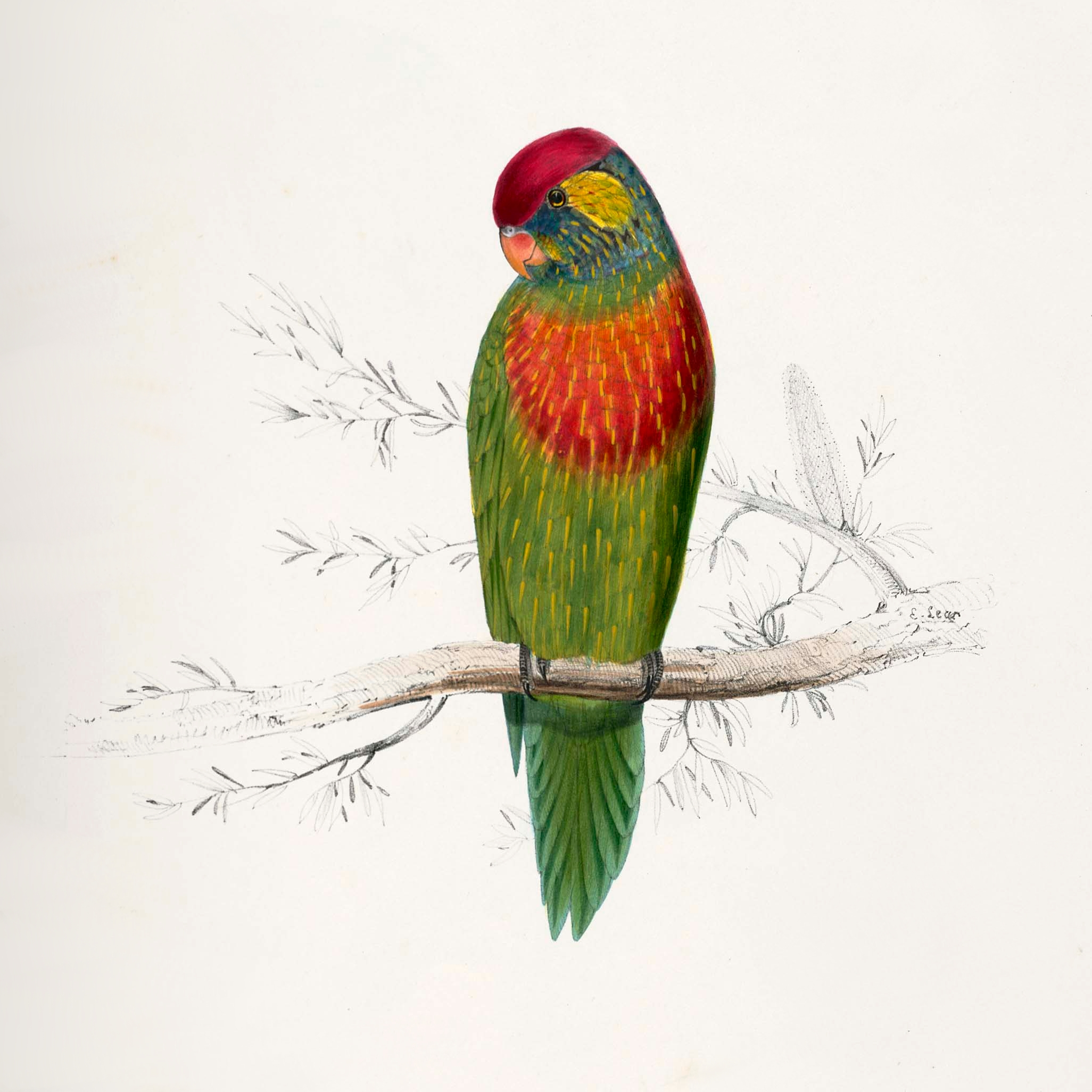
Holotype by Edward Lear

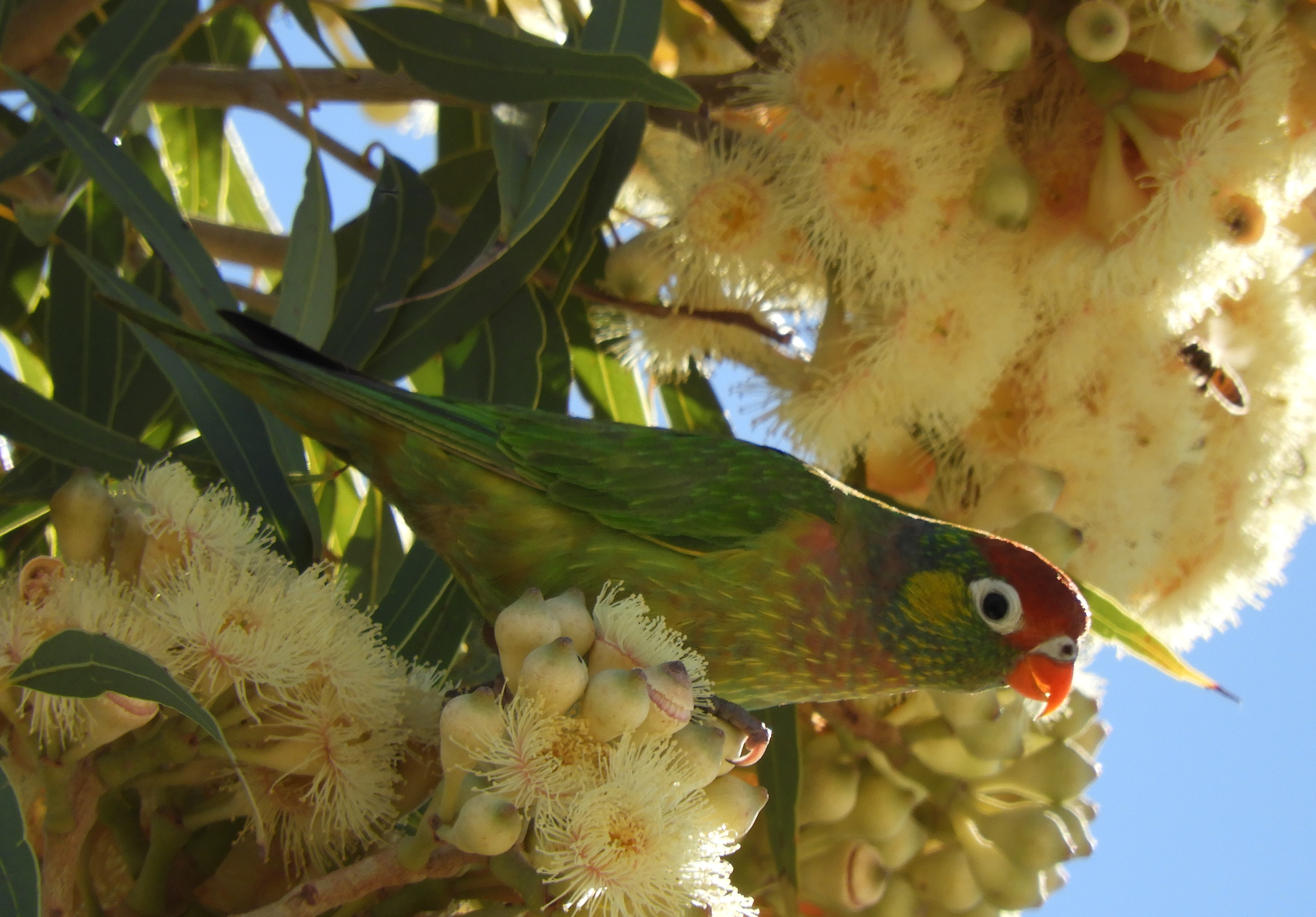
Varied lorikeet at Cloncurry, Queensland
