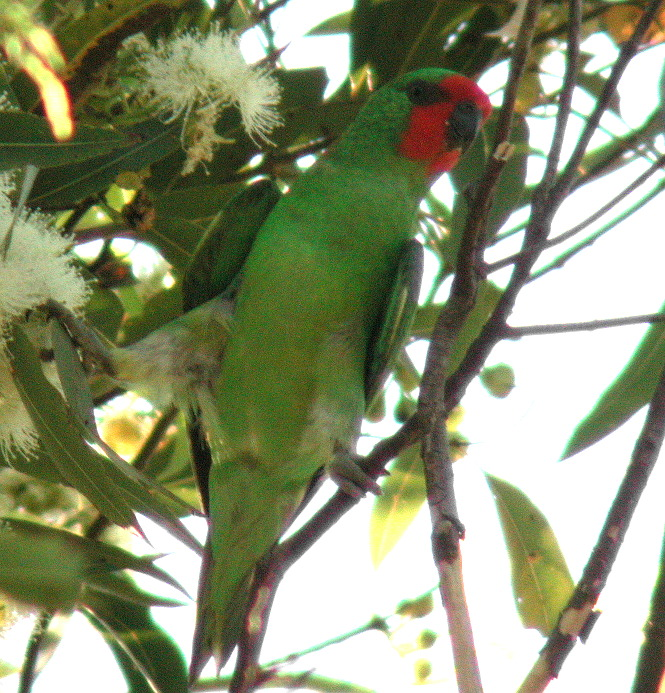

Conservation status
- Least Concern (IUCN 3.1)

Scientific classification
- Kingdom: Animalia
- Phylum: Chordata
- Class: Aves
- Order: Psittaciformes
- Family: Psittaculidae
- Genus: Psitteuteles
- Species: P. pusillus

Binomial name
- Psitteuteles pusillus (Shaw, 1790)
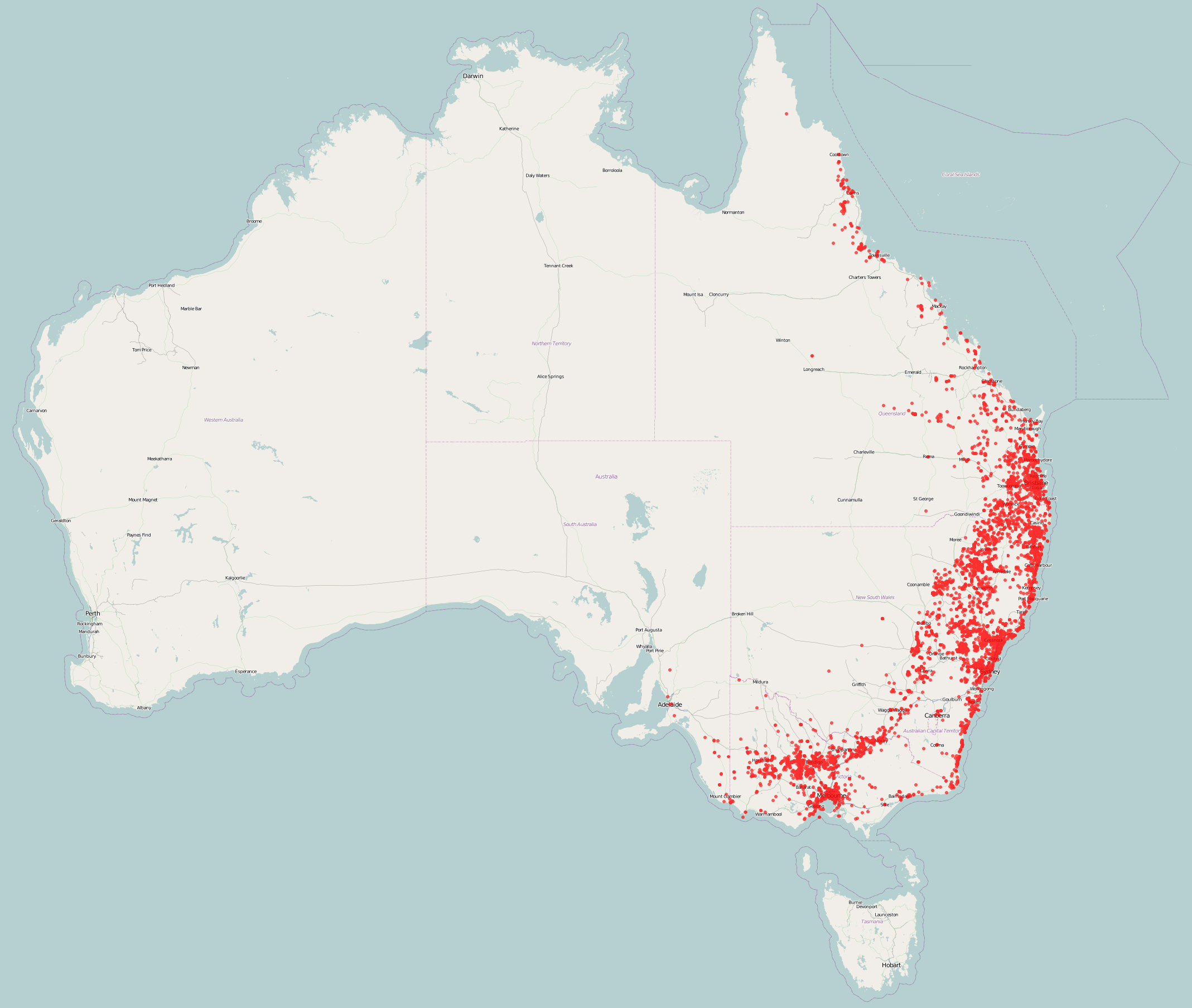
- The Distribution of the little lorikeet, Data from The Atlas of Living Australia

Synonyms
- Parvipsitta pusilla

= Little lorikeet =

Species of bird

The little lorikeet (Psitteuteles pusillus) is a species of parrot in the family Psittaculidae. It is endemic to Australia. It is a small parrot, predominantly green in plumage with a red face. Its natural habitats are temperate eucalyptus forest and woodland, subtropical or tropical dry forest and subtropical or tropical moist lowland forest.

== Taxonomy ==
The little lorikeet was first described by ornithologist George Shaw in 1790 as Psittacus pusillus. Its specific epithet is the Latin pusilla "small". Other common names include tiny lorikeet, red-faced lorikeet, gizzie, slit, and formerly a local indigenous term gerryang.

== Description ==
Measuring 15 cm (5.9 in) in length, the male and female are similarly coloured, although the latter is a little duller. The crown, lores and throat are red, the nape and shoulder bronze-coloured and the remainder of the plumage green. The belly is paler and yellow-green. In adults, the bill is black and the iris golden in colour. Immature individuals have a paler orange face and a brown iris and bill.

== Distribution and habitat ==
The little lorikeet is found in eastern and southern Australia, from the vicinity of Cairns southwards through Queensland and New South Wales from the western slopes of the Great Dividing Range eastwards to the coast, through most of Victoria and southeastern South Australia. It also occurs in Tasmania although it is uncommon there. They are found in forest, especially in the vicinity of flowering or fruit-bearing vegetation.

== Behaviour and ecology ==
The little lorikeet is gregarious and often flocks with rainbow, musk and purple-crowned lorikeets.

=== Food and feeding ===
Little lorikeets feed mostly on nectar and pollen of flowers in the open canopy of woodland trees like Eucalyptus, Angophora and Melaleuca species. They have also been known to feed on native grasstrees (Xanthorrhoea spp.), and occasionally on fruit like the native mistletoe and introduced loquat (Eriobotrya japonica). They will occasionally visit orchards.

=== Breeding ===
Breeding season is from May in the north, or August in the south, to December. The nest is a hollow in a tree and a clutch of 3–5 matte white roundish eggs, measuring 20 x 16 mm, is laid. The incubation period is around three weeks.

== Aviculture ==
Although first exported to Europe in 1877, the little lorikeet is only very rarely seen outside Australia. Even in its native country, it is uncommon in captivity. It has a reputation of being difficult to keep.

== Conservation status ==
The Little Lorikeet has a wide distribution in Eastern Australia, however, a decline in abundance has been recognised in two Australian States. The species is currently listed in South Australia as 'Endangered' under the National Parks and Wildlife Act (1972). In NSW the species is listed as 'Vulnerable' under the Biodiversity Conservation Act (2016). In South Australia the Little Lorikeets have become rare where they were once abundant. In NSW there has been a marked decline in flock sizes and frequency.

== Gallery ==
Pair of little lorikeets, Pikedale, S. Queensland
