= Minchin =

Minchin is a surname. Notable people with the surname include:

- A. Keith Minchin (1899–1963), founder of Koala Farm, Adelaide
- Alfred Minchin (1917–1998), British Free Corps collaborator
- Alice Minchin (1889–1966), New Zealand teacher and librarian
- Devon Minchin (1919–2014), Australian businessman and author
- Edward Alfred Minchin (1866–1915), British zoologist
- Elizabeth Minchin, Australian classicist
- Frederick F. Minchin (1890–1927?), English aviator
- George Minchin (1845–1914), Irish mathematician and physicist
- Humphrey Minchin (1727–1796), British politician
- James Minchin (1858–1919), Australian cricketer
- John Minchin (c. 1741–1793), English cricketer
- Louise Minchin (born 1968), British television presenter
- Nel Minchin (born 1984/85), Australian film director
- Nick Minchin (born 1953), Australian politician, senator for South Australia
- R. E. Minchin (1831–1893), first director, Adelaide Zoo, South Australia

- A. C. Minchin (1857–1934), director, Adelaide Zoo 1893 to 1934
- R. R. Minchin (grandson), director, Adelaide Zoo 1935 to 1940

- Tim Minchin (born 1975), Australian comedian, actor and musician
- William Minchin (1774–1821), Irish-born British army officer

Fictional characters:

- Miss Minchin, headmistress in A Little Princess

== Places ==
- Minchin Abad, a city in Punjab, Pakistan

- Minchinabad Tehsil, a tehsil in Punjab, Pakistan

- Minchinhampton, a town in Stroud District, England

== See also ==
- Edward Minchen (1852–1913), an Australian botanical artist
- Zhou Ming-Zhen (1918–1996), aka Minchen M. Chow, a Chinese paleomammalogist
- John Minshull (1741–1793), aka Minchin, an English cricketer
- Lake Minchin, a former lake on the Altiplano of South America
- Minna Herzlieb nicknamed Minchin (1789–1865), a German female publisher
