= Koala Park Sanctuary =

Privately run wildlife park in Australia

- Koala Park Sanctuary
- Interactive map of Koala Park Sanctuary
- 33°44′31″S 151°2′42″E
- Date opened: October 1930
- Location: 84 Castle Hill Road, West Pennant Hills, Sydney, Australia
- Land area: 10 acres
- No. of species: 24
- Website: koalapark-sanctuary.com.au

The Koala Park Sanctuary is a privately owned and run Australian wildlife park on 10 acres in West Pennant Hills, a northern suburb of Sydney. The park is known for its collection of koalas and other Australian animals and is set in a rainforest-like area. It exists to show Australian native animals and birds and teach the public about them. The park receives about 400,000 guests annually.

== History ==
The construction of the Koala Park Sanctuary began in the 1920s, and it opened in October 1930. The park is situated on a 40-acre allotment across Castle Hill Road, which initially started as the Koala Park in the late 1920s. The souvenir room and kiosk were built as tea rooms. However, the site's exposure to winter winds made it challenging to maintain the animals' health.

Environmentalist Noel Burnet had seen the decimation of the koala population for the fur trade. At the time there was little awareness of ecological issues and the trade was seen as helpful to Australia's balance of payments.

For conservation and humanitarian reasons, the Koala Club of Australia took up the issue. Burnet wrote:

"He dedicated the remainder of his life to researching and preserving the animals' habitat."

== Animals ==
The park is a walk-through wildlife park with most of the animals being exhibited behind wire and cage-style exhibits. The following animals are currently held in the park's collection:

List of animals
- Koalas
- Common wombats
- Eastern grey kangaroos
- Red kangaroos
- Swamp wallabies
- (Albino) Bennett's wallabies
- Dingoes
- Golden brushtail possums
- Common ringtail possums
- Short-beaked echidnas
- Spinifex hopping mice
- Australian pelicans
- Emus
- Southern cassowaries
- Wedge-tailed eagles
- Eastern barn owls
- Barking owls
- Eastern grass owls
- Tawny frogmouths
- Laughing kookaburras
- Sulphur-crested cockatoos
- Red-tailed black cockatoos
- Yellow-tailed black cockatoos
- Galahs
- Little corellas
- Eclectus parrots
- Rainbow lorikeets
- Blue peafowls
- Pied currawongs
- Lace monitors
- Frill-necked lizard
- Eastern water dragons
- Central bearded dragons
- Jacky dragons
- Ornate dragons
- Northern blue-tongued lizard
- Cunningham's skink
- Centralian carpet pythons
- Diamond python
- Eastern long-necked turtle
- (Alpacas, Shetland ponies and other farm animals like goats and chickens also at the park)

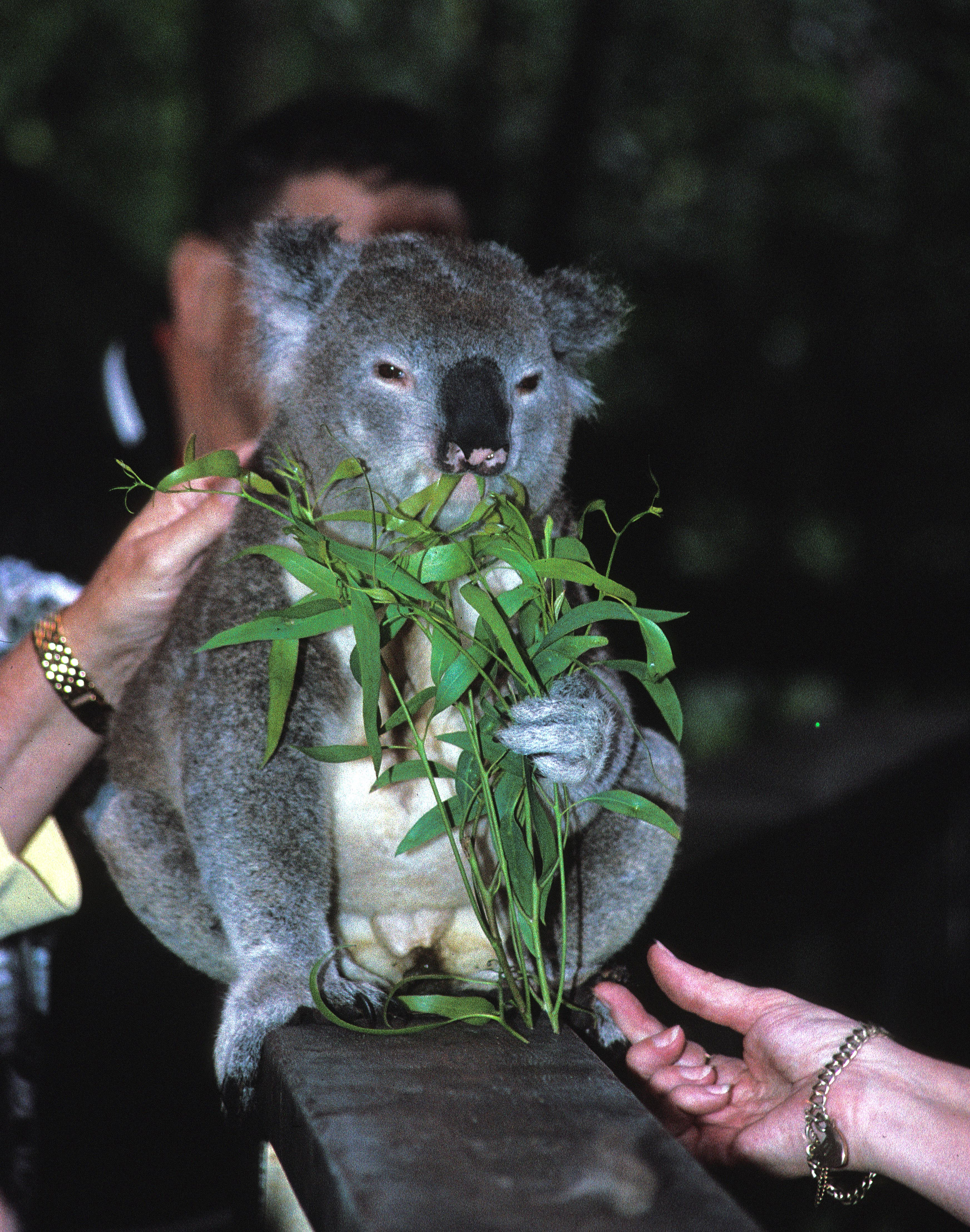
Koala at the park

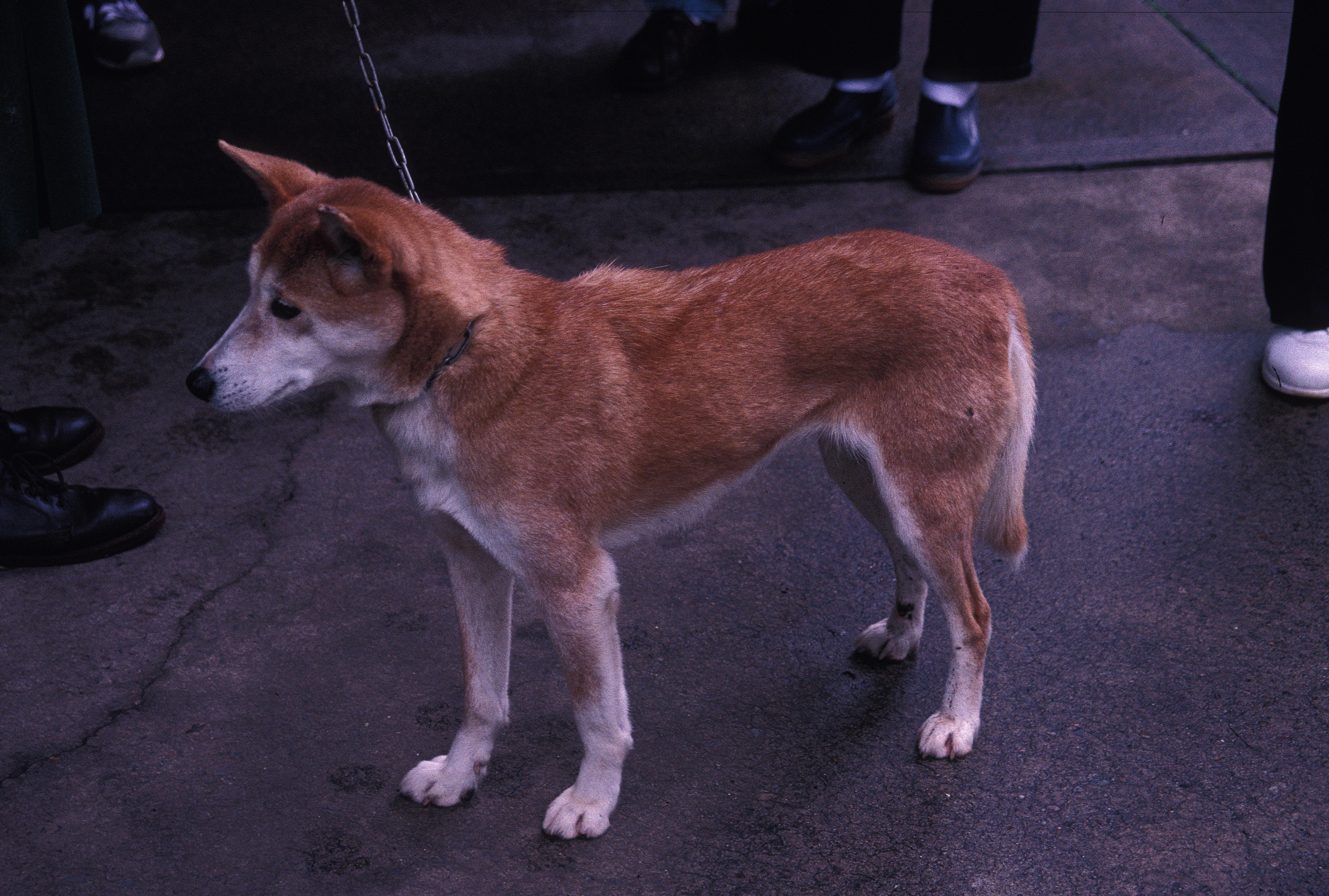
Dingo

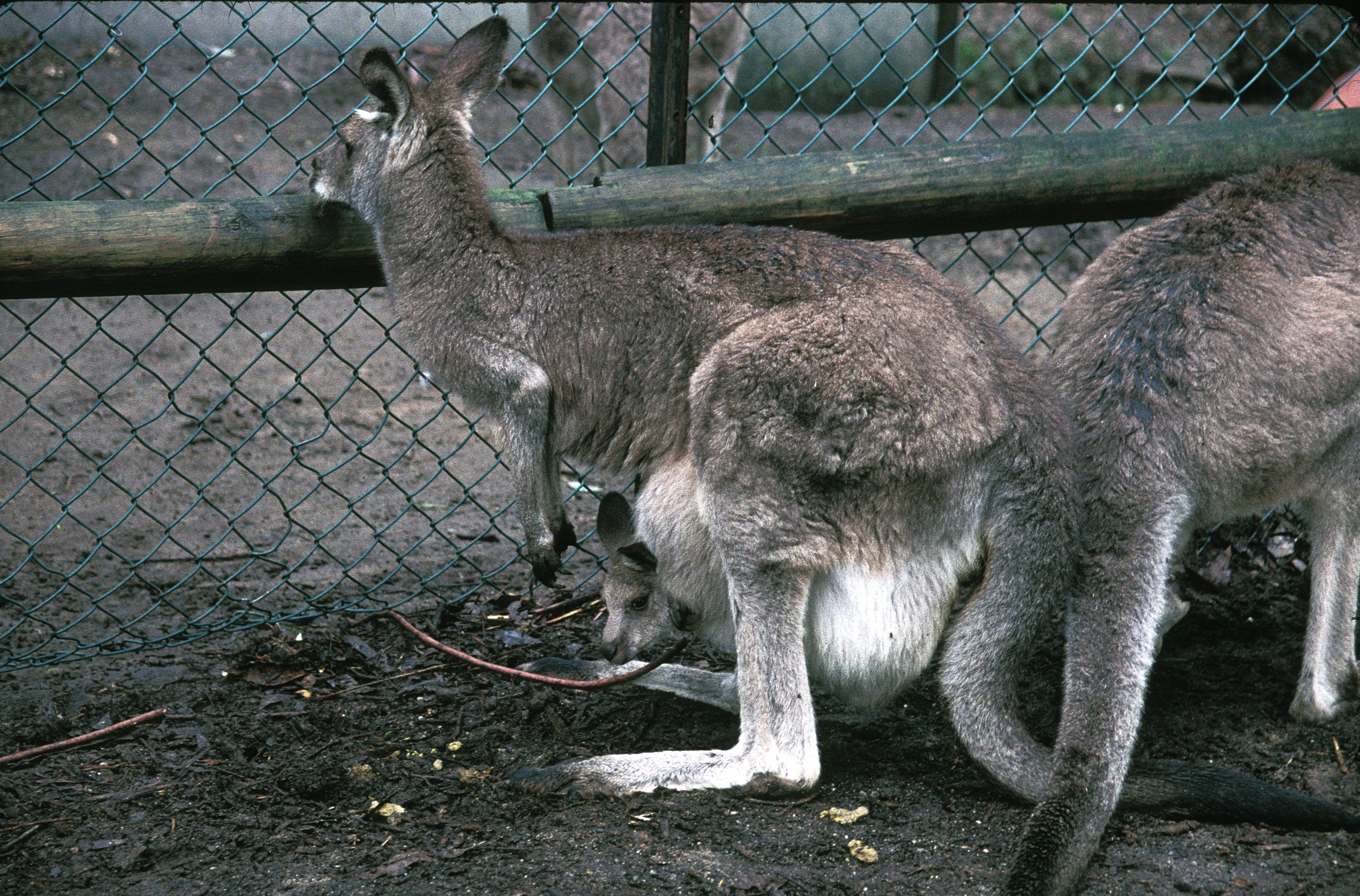
Kangaroo

== Events ==
The park formerly had a live sheep shearing exhibition run at various times throughout the day called "The Stockman's Camp". It also recounts Australian bush stories sometimes at a billy tea drinking presentation. The park also allows visitors to handle the animals, abiding by the Queensland Code of Practice for koala handling time.

== Conservation ==
The Koala Park Sanctuary opened a koala research hospital in 1930, caring for sick and injured native animals and releasing them back into the wild. It is open to the public and provides education about native animals and the problems faced by the koalas living close to humans.

Burnet was aware of the risk of the extinction of koalas. The Koala Park successfully bred sixty koalas in its first 11 years and it claims to be the first sanctuary to breed koalas in captivity. The park opened without subsidies from the government.

== Controversy ==
In December 2010, the Department of Primary Industries inspectors reported finding ageing and dirty animal exhibits, drainage problems, and out-of-date records. The inspectors issued a series of notices to Koala Park Sanctuary to fix the issues. A newspaper editor attended the park and claimed a number of issues had not been resolved and believed that animals were suffering. However, an RSPCA inspector who visited the park said he did not believe any of the animals were suffering or had been neglected or were malnourished.

In February 2016, the RSPCA fined the sanctuary $75,000 and banned them from acquiring new koalas for six months due to a koala being dehydrated and emaciated and five koalas showing signs of chlamydia.

== See also ==
- Koala Farm, Adelaide
- Lone Pine Koala Sanctuary, Brisbane
