= Lone Pine Koala Sanctuary =

- Interactive map of Lone Pine Koala Sanctuary
- 27°31′58.56″S 152°58′9.47″E
- Date opened: 1927
- Location: Fig Tree Pocket, Queensland, Australia
- Land area: 18 ha (44 acres)
- Website: lonepinekoalasanctuary.com

Lone Pine Koala Sanctuary is an 18-hectare (44-acre) koala sanctuary in the Brisbane suburb of Fig Tree Pocket in Queensland, Australia.

Founded in 1927, it is the oldest and largest koala sanctuary of its kind in the world. The park houses approximately 80 species of Australian animals.

== History ==
The name originates from a lone hoop pine that was planted by the Clarkson family, the first owners of the 4.6-hectare (11-acre) site. The sanctuary opened in 1927 to provide a safe refuge to sick, injured, and orphaned koalas, at a time when they were being killed for their fur. The founder of the sanctuary, Claude Reid, recognised the need to protect this iconic species and initiated the protection of their habitat.

The sanctuary began with two koalas called Jack and Jill. Lone Pine became known internationally during World War II when Americans, including Douglas MacArthur's wife, visited the park to view the native Australian animals.

== Wildlife ==
A bellowing male koala in the sanctuary.

Until the end of June 2024, visitors were allowed to hold some of the koalas at the sanctuary for a fee with strict regulations ensure that each koala was not held for more than thirty minutes every day with other rules to ensure animal welfare, e.g. only holding captive-bred koalas with a suitable temperament. Fees paid for souvenir photos of visitors holding koalas helped fund new enclosures, research projects and eucalyptus plantations. From 1 July 2024, holding koalas is no longer allowed, but visitors will still be able to get close to some koalas. Although some animal welfare groups have long expressed concerned over the practice of visitors holding koalas, research from Griffith University showed that koalas accustomed to being held exhibited stress during lockdowns during the COVID pandemic when people could not visit the sanctuary.

Visitors can feed and pet the free-roaming kangaroos in the 5-hectare (12-acre) kangaroo reserve.

Rainbow lorikeets fly to the Lone Pine Koala Sanctuary for the specially prepared nectar meals at the sanctuary. Visitors can feed the lorikeets. Once a day there is a bird of prey show with several kinds of raptors showing off their speed, agility and keen eyesight.

The "Koala Forest" is a large koala enclosure with over 30 koalas surrounding the customers. The koalas are fed mid-morning and mid-afternoon.

Lone Pine Koala Sanctuary opened their new koala science and research facility, the Brisbane Koala Science Institute, on Saturday 30 June 2018. Constructed in collaboration with the Brisbane City Council, the facility is home to two full-time research staff, a research laboratory, and a "Koala Biobank" (koala genetic depository). Lone Pine hopes to improve collaboration within the science community through the use of the Institute's meeting spaces and seminar hall. Lone Pine visitors will be able to view the Institute daily from 9am to 5pm, via the public viewing area.

Wildlife list

Mammals

- Koala
- Common wombat
- Southern hairy-nosed wombat
- Platypus
- Short-beaked echidna
- Red kangaroo
- Eastern grey kangaroo
- Lumholtz's tree-kangaroo
- Red-necked wallaby
- Swamp wallaby
- Tasmanian devil
- Dingo
- Grey-headed flying fox
- Spectacled flying fox
- Little red flying fox
- Northern brown bandicoot
- Australian miniature goat
- Guinea pig
- Miniature pig
- Sheep

Birds

- Emu
- Southern cassowary
- Wedge-tailed eagle
- Peregrine falcon
- Black kite
- Brahminy kite
- Eastern barn owl
- Barking owl
- Tawny frogmouth
- Laughing kookaburra
- Red-tailed black cockatoo
- Major Mitchell's cockatoo
- Gang-gang cockatoo
- Sulphur-crested cockatoo
- Princess parrot
- Rainbow lorikeet
- Bush stone-curlew
- ISA brown chicken

Reptiles and amphibians

- Freshwater crocodile
- Saltwater crocodile
- Lace monitor
- Mertens' water monitor
- Spiny-tailed monitor
- Pygmy mulga monitor
- Central bearded dragon
- Rankin's dragon
- Eastern blue-tongued lizard
- Shingleback lizard
- Hosmer's spiny-tailed skink
- Pond slider
- Black-headed python
- Carpet python
- Olive python
- Woma python
- Centralian carpet python
- Common death adder
- Broad-headed snake
- Magnificent tree frog

== Transport ==
There is an entrance to the sanctuary from a car park, and also an entrance to the sanctuary from the Brisbane River. One can arrive by private car or taxi, a journey of approximately 20 minutes from the city centre. One can also catch a Transport for Brisbane bus, or arrive by express boat from the Queensland Cultural Centre pontoon.

== Photos ==
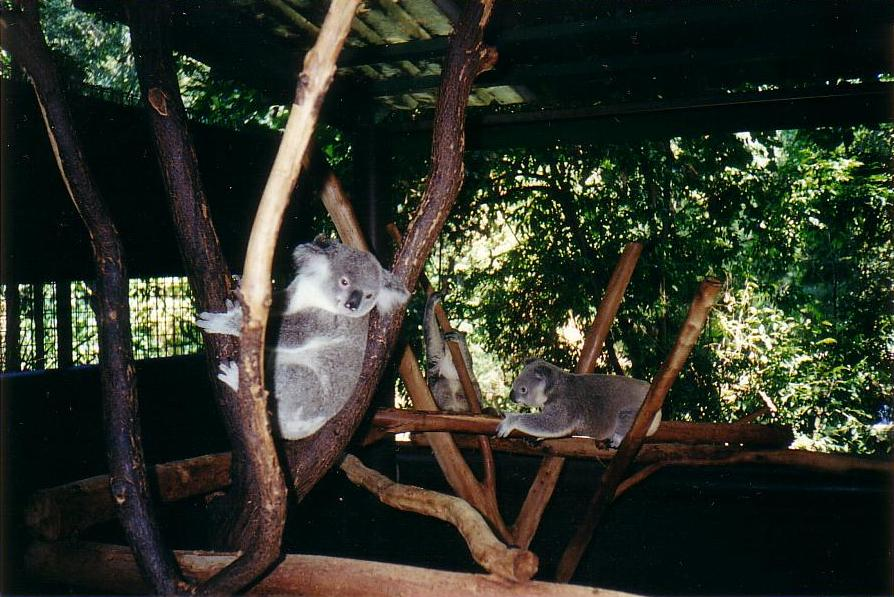
Koalas

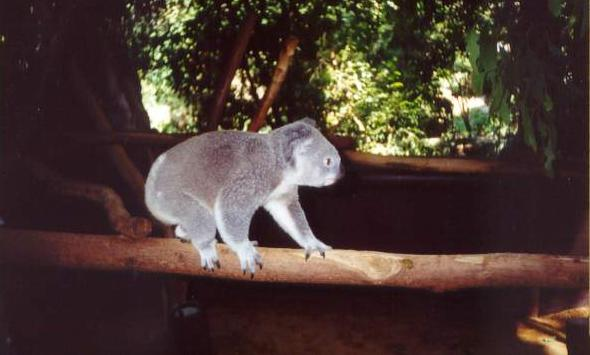
Koala walking along a branch

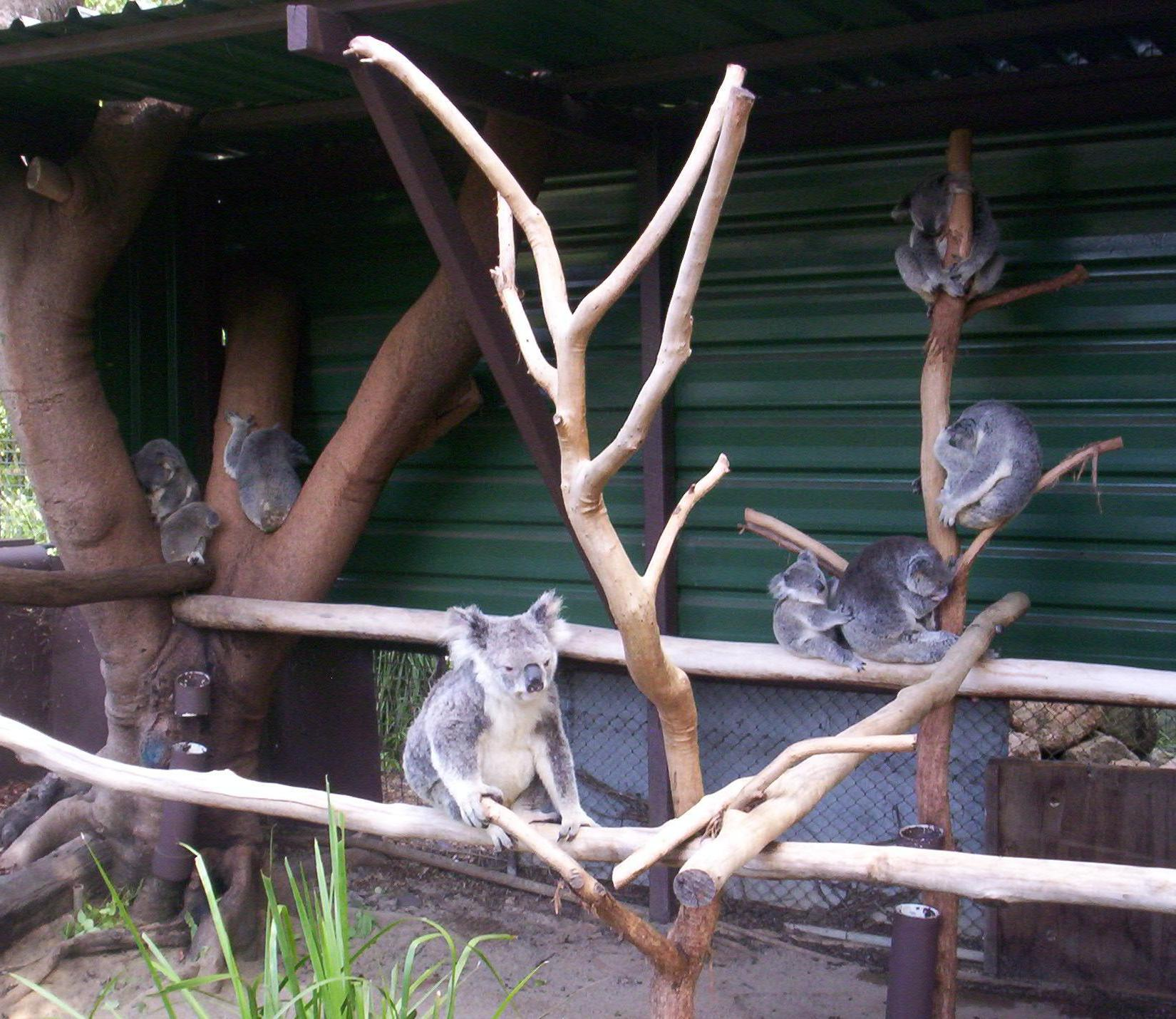
Mother and baby koalas

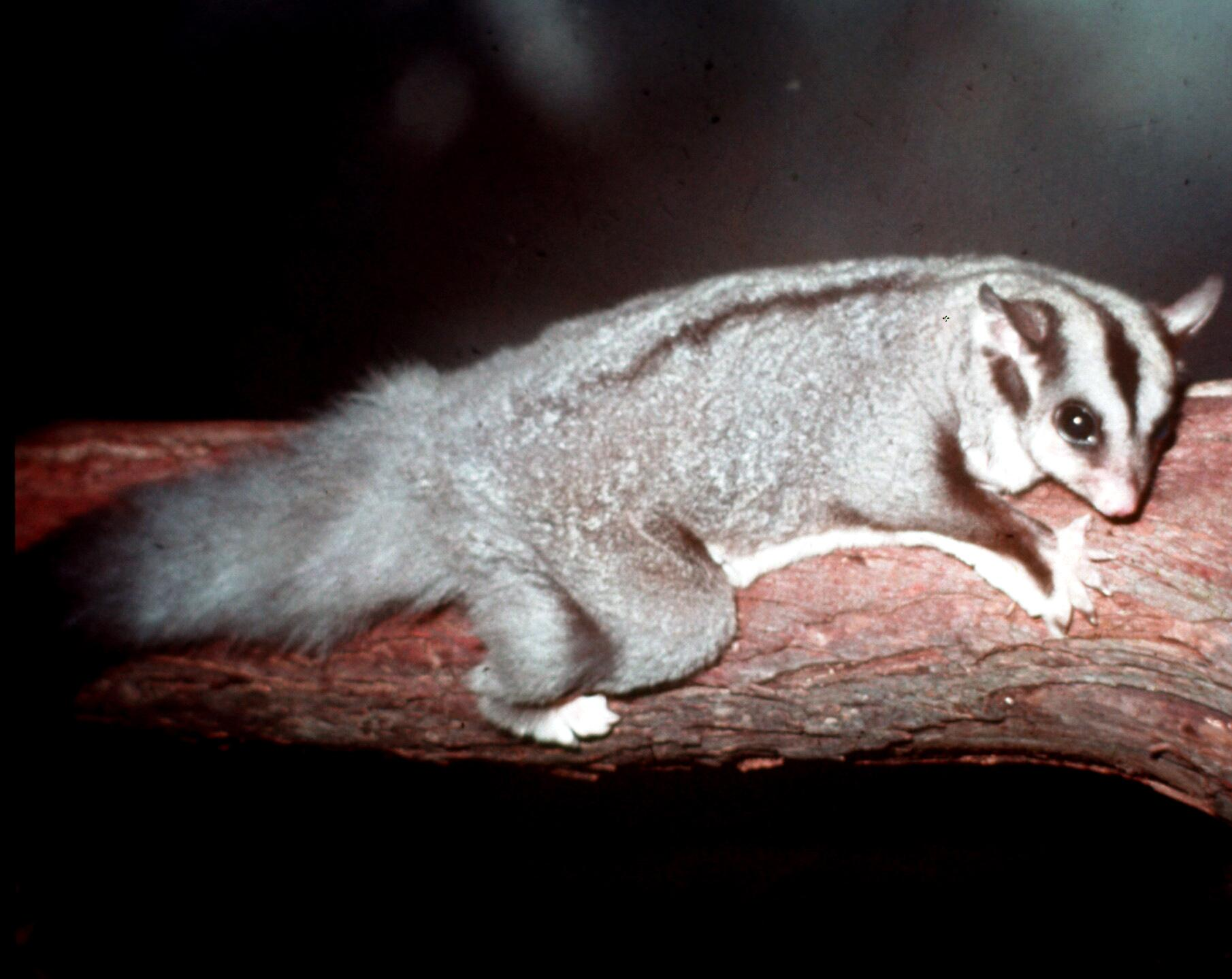
Squirrel glider

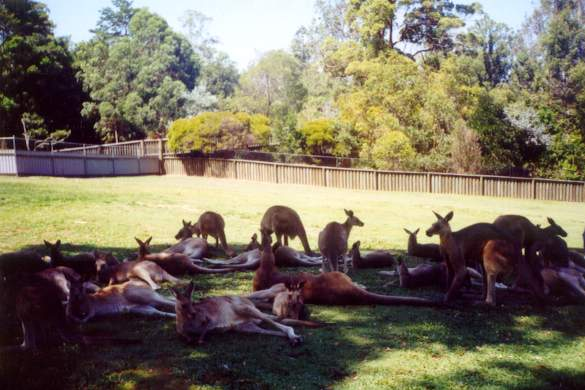
Kangaroos

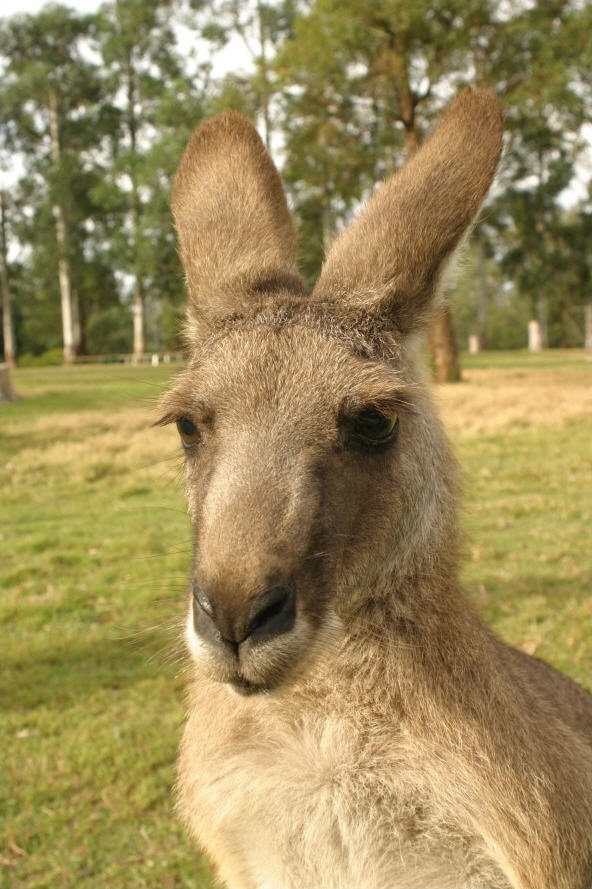
Kangaroo

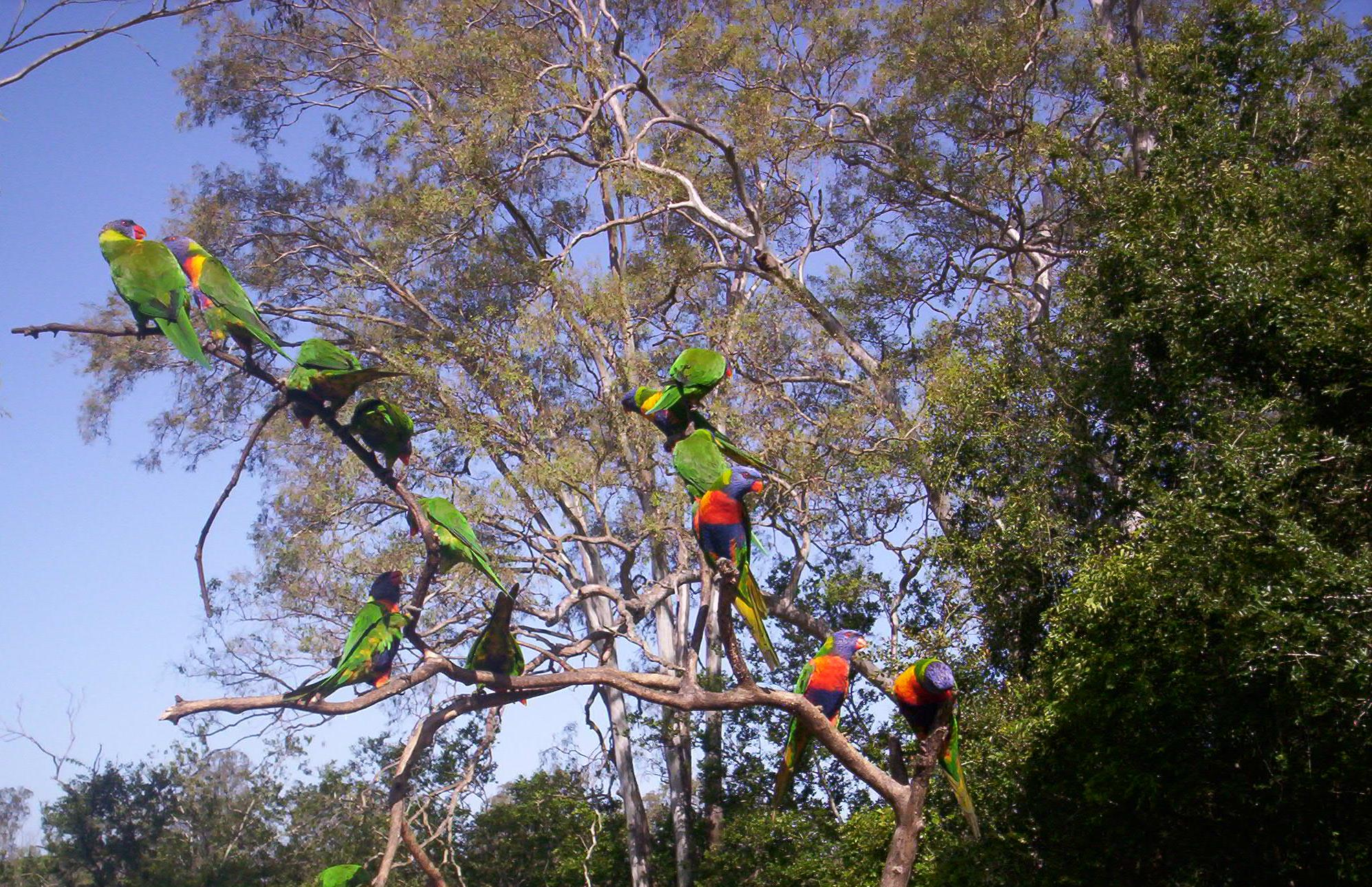
Rainbow lorikeets

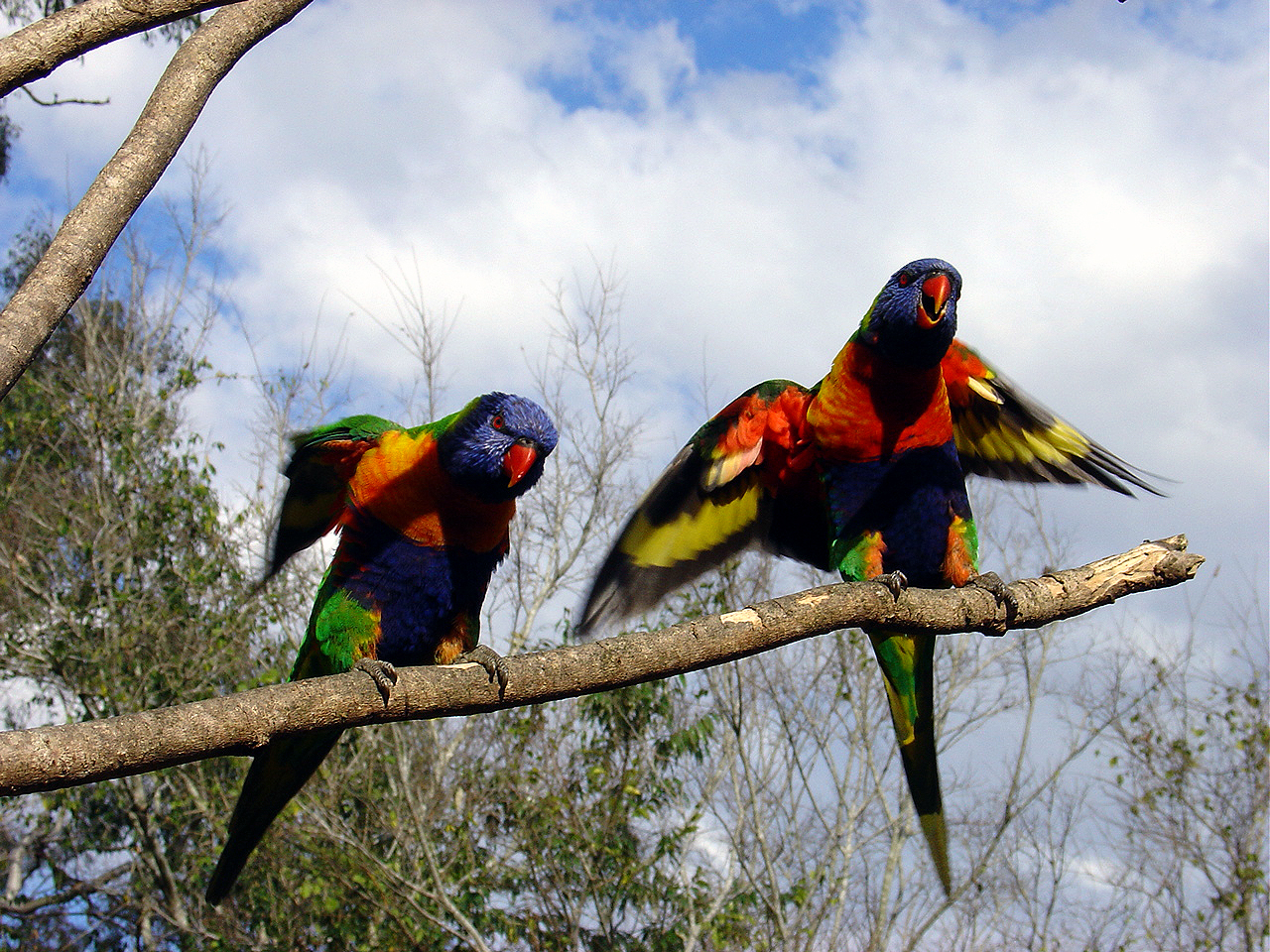
Rainbow lorikeets

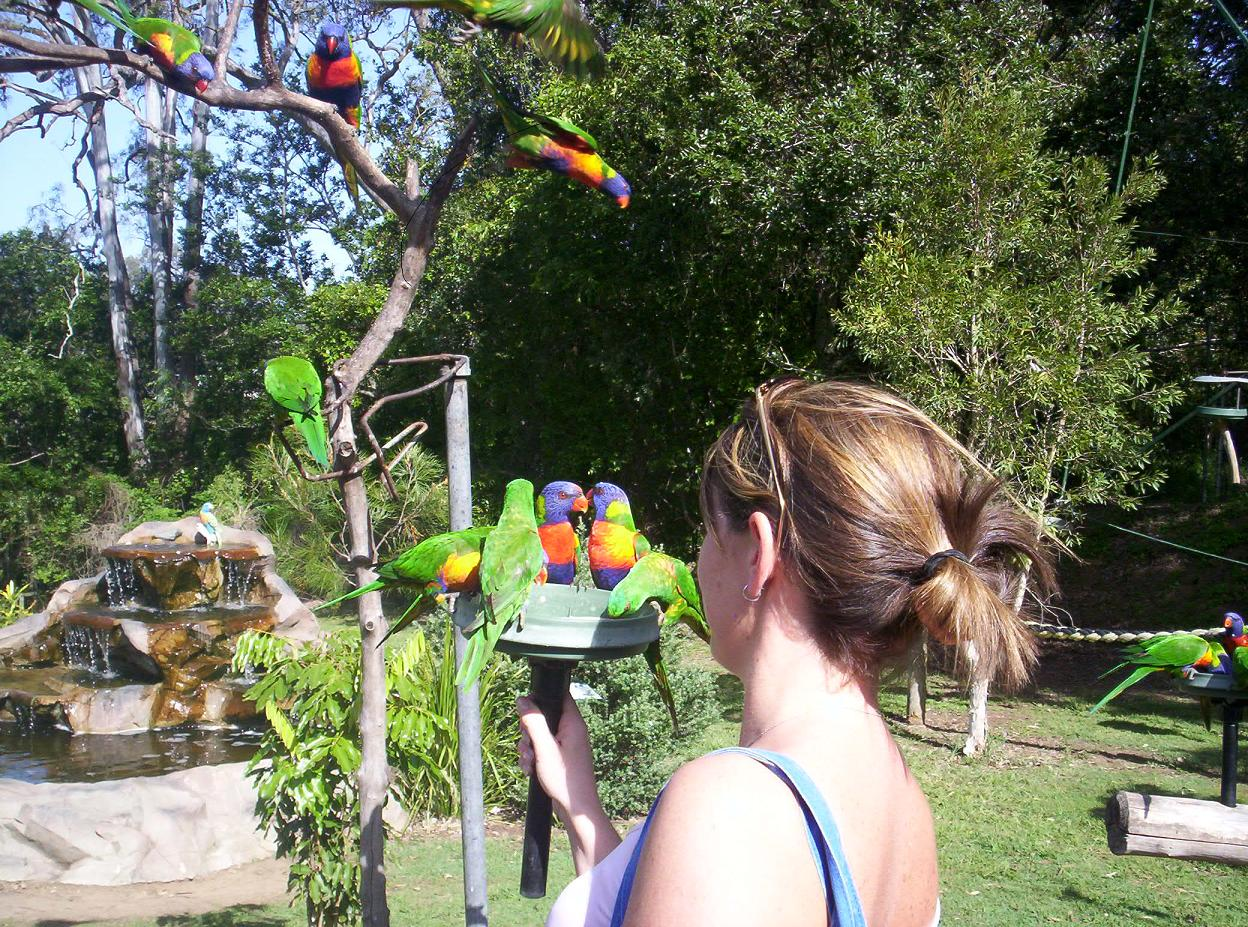
Rainbow lorikeets at feeding time

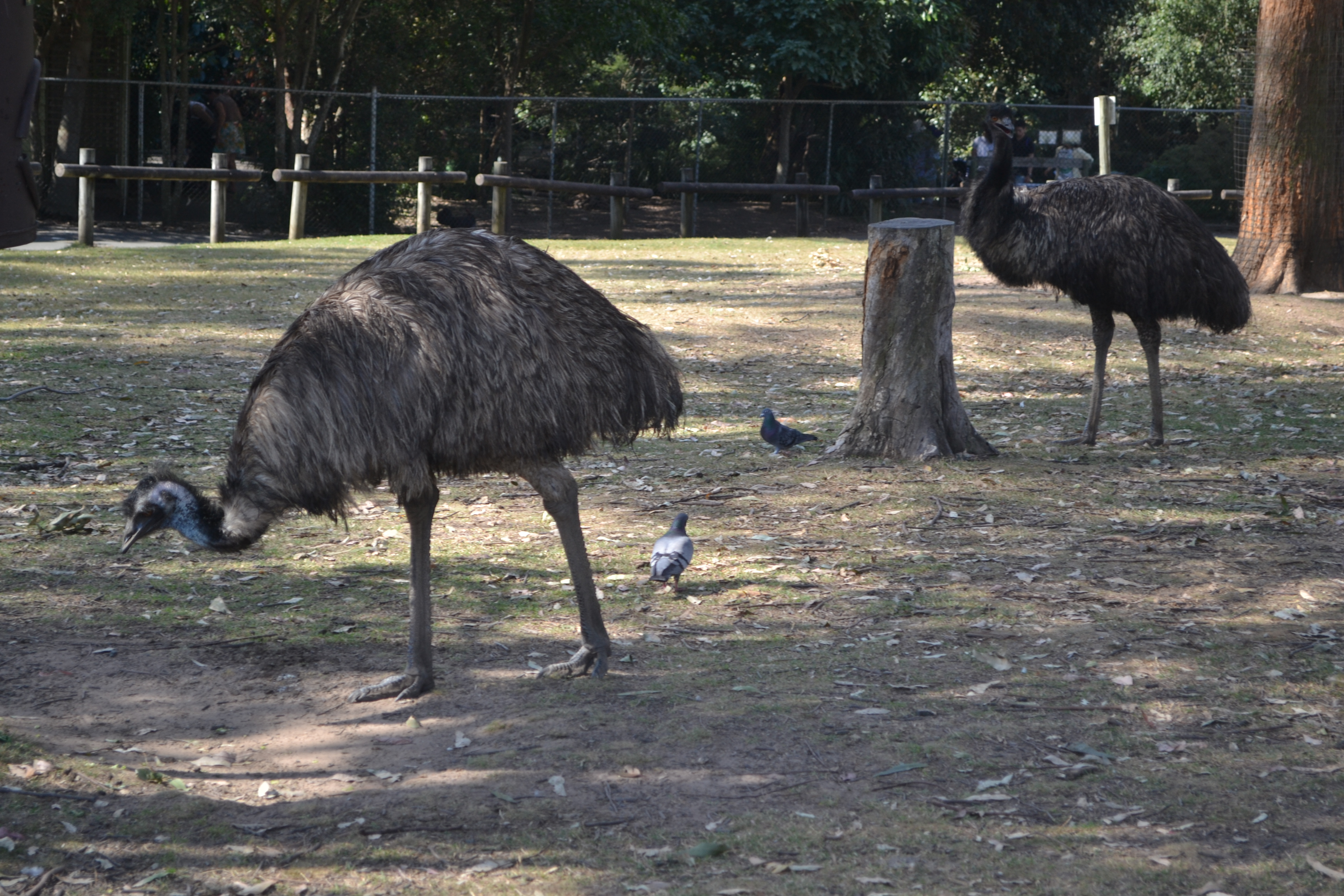
Emus

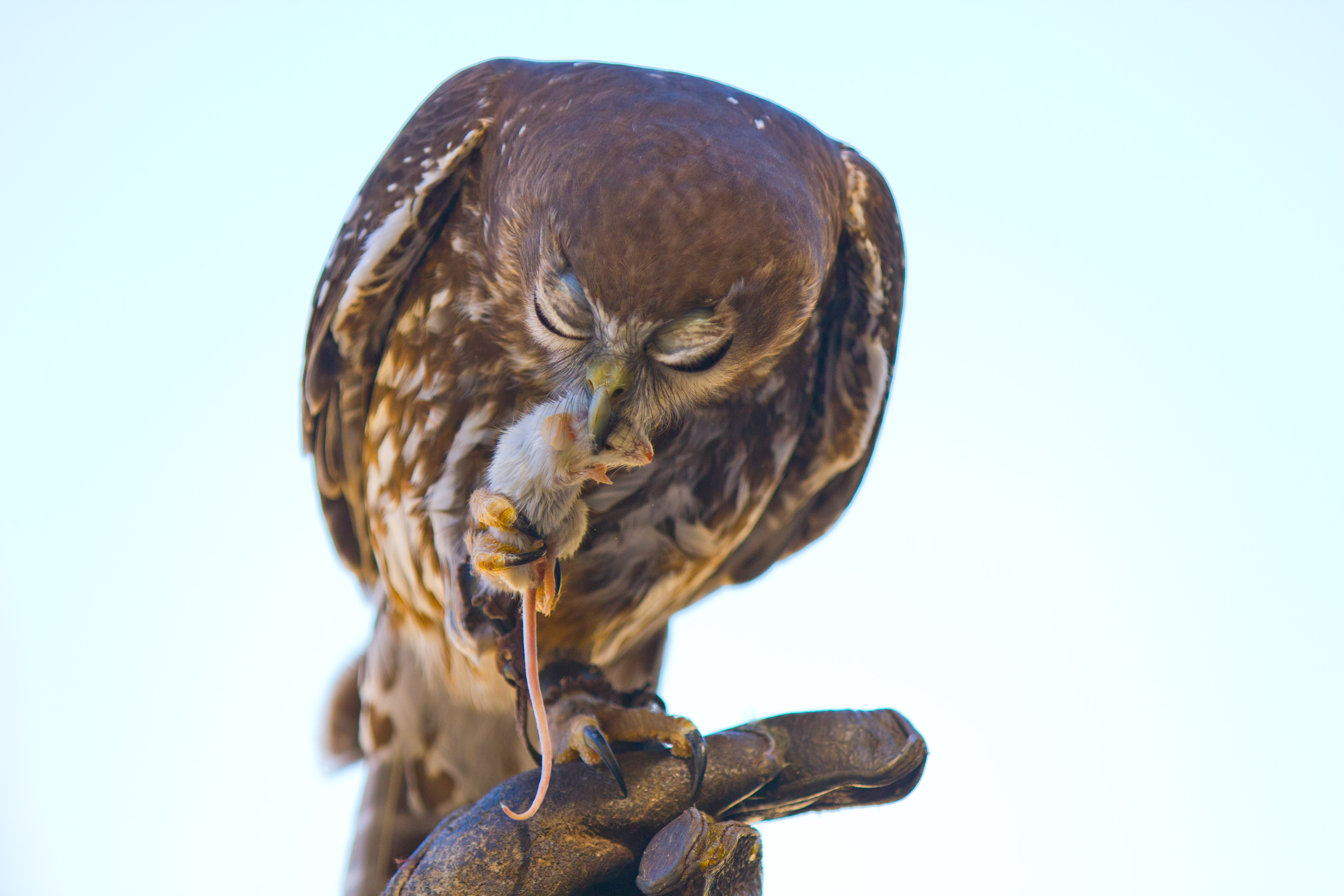
Rocket the barking owl enjoying a reward at Birds of Prey display

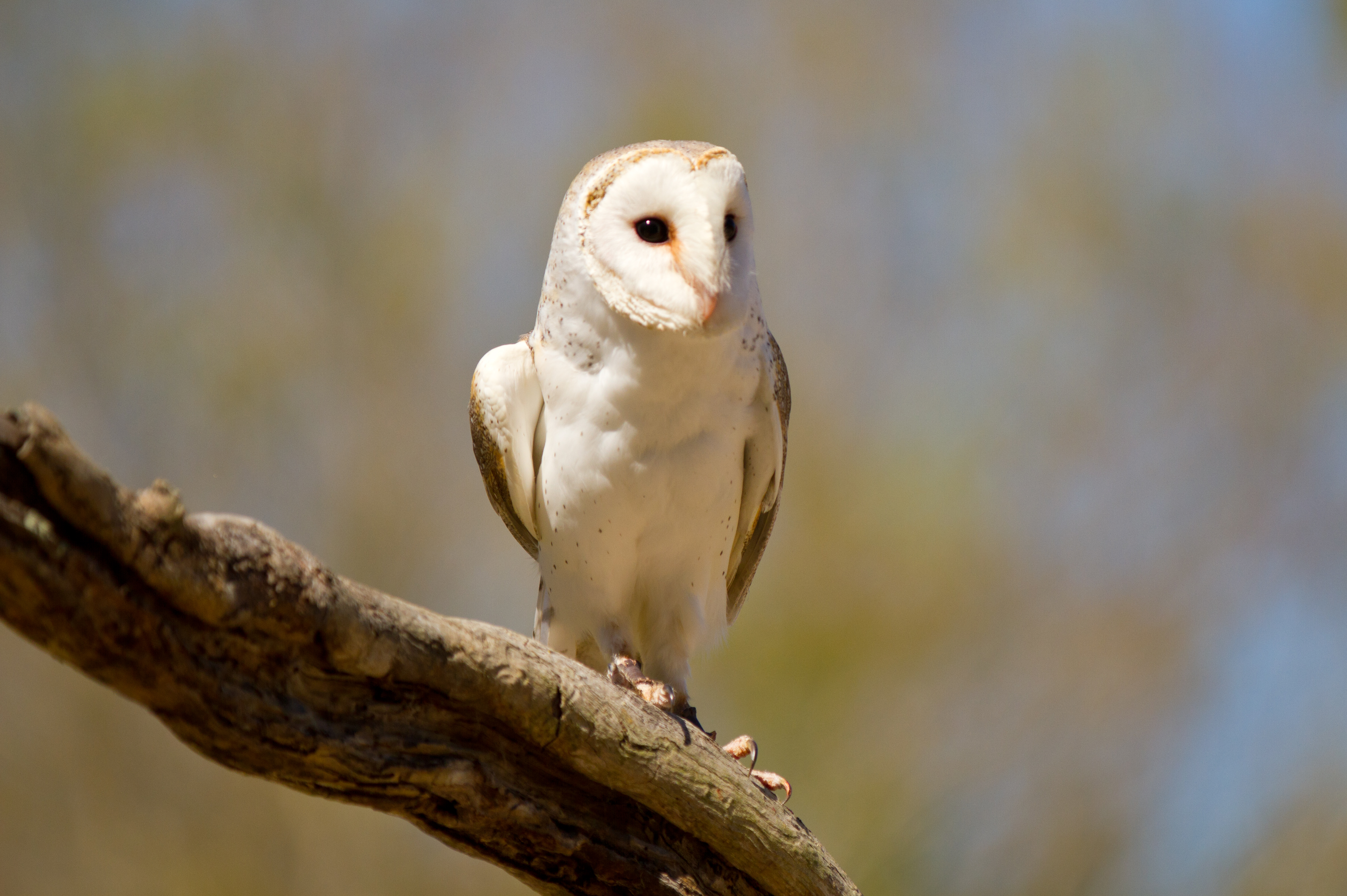
Barn owl at Birds of Prey display

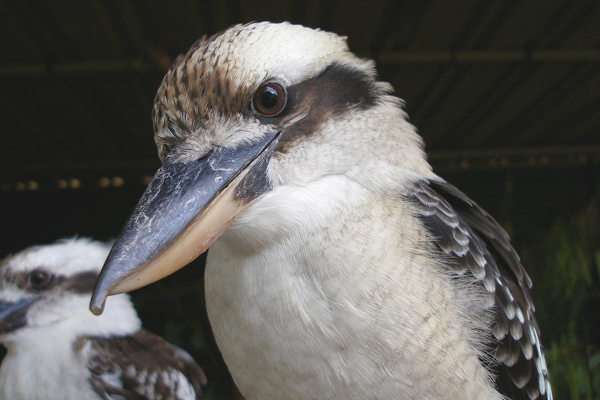
Laughing kookaburra

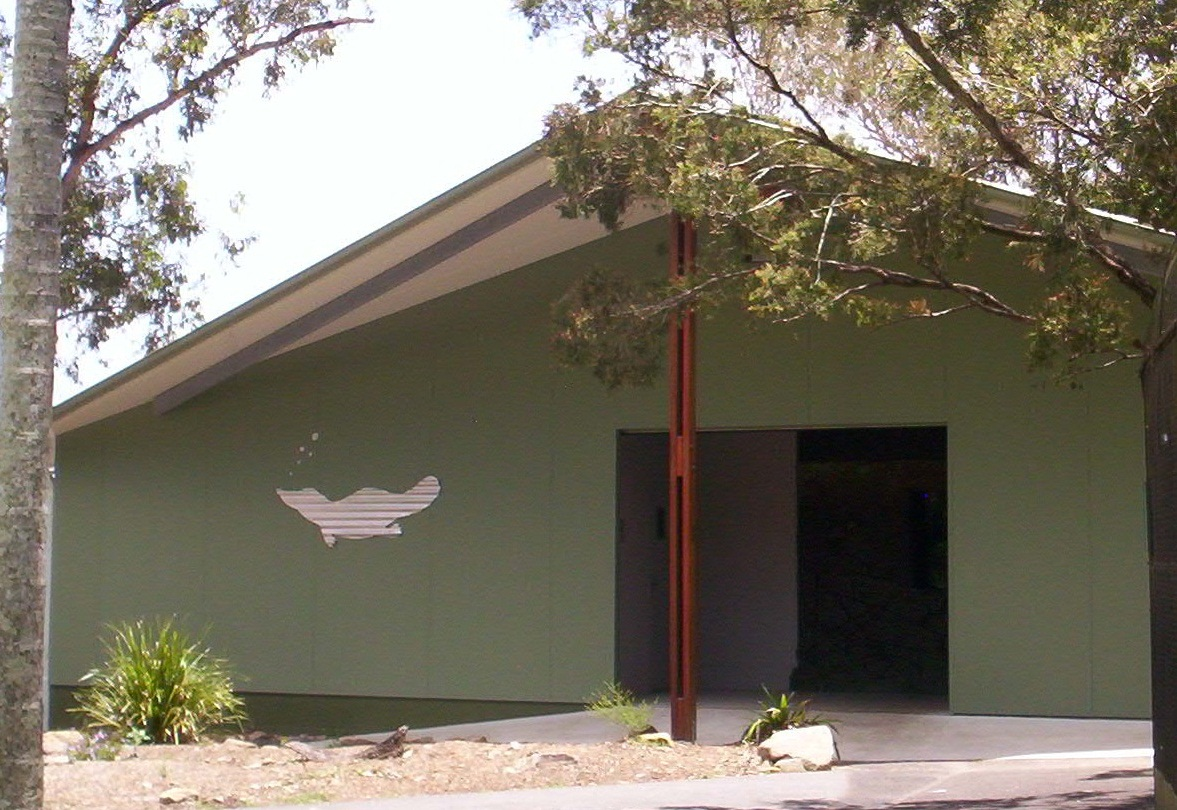
Platypus House

== Awards ==
In 2009 as part of the Q150 celebrations, the Lone Pine Koala Sanctuary was announced as one of the Q150 Icons of Queensland for its role as a "location".

== See also ==
- Australian Koala Foundation
- Marsupial
- Koala Park Sanctuary, Sydney
- Koala Farm, Adelaide
- Koala conservation § Introductions
