= Rob Bredl =

Australian filmmaker

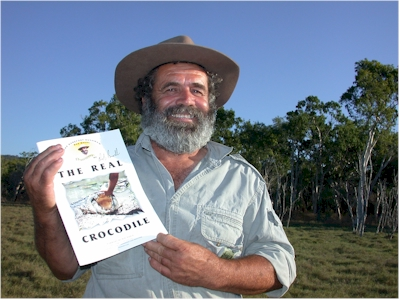

Robert Harold Bredl (born 18 July 1950 in Renmark, South Australia) is an Australian documentary film-maker, a reptile specialist and owner of the "Blue Planet Wildlife Park" (near Airlie Beach, Queensland). He became known through his many documentaries, such as Killer Instinct (53 episodes), Deadly Predators (10 episodes), as well as The Barefoot Bushman series (8 episodes). His documentaries are being shown on TV stations in more than 45 countries worldwide. Rob's documentaries have so far been translated into 36 languages. His best known documentary Kissing Crocodiles has been shown in over 100 countries worldwide on Discovery Channel and National Geographic.

== Life ==
Bredl's father Josef Bredl, a Hungarian carpenter and painter, and German mother, arrived in Australia around 1950 and first lived with their two sons Josef and Robert in a shack on Ral Ral Avenue, on the banks of the Ral Ral Creek, near Renmark, South Australia.

Rob was catching crocodiles with his father and brothers even as a child (in the Northern Territory). He attracts crocodiles by hitting the water's surface repeatedly with a stick. His father Josef was a hunter in Austria and found a job as a crocodile hunter after he arrived in Australia. This job took him and his family to the Northern Territory. In later years, Bredl's brother Josef "Joe" Bredl (1948–2007) became known as one of the best snake experts and catchers. The Bredl's python (Morelia bredli) was named after him.

His realisation of the quickly diminishing numbers of crocodiles was part of the reason for the Australian Government ban on hunting and killing crocodiles. As there were only about 2,000 crocodiles left at the time, Josef Bredl started to breed them.

Josef, his oldest son Joe and Rob established a crocodile farm at the Edward River Station on the Cape York peninsula in Queensland. With the help of local Aboriginals they caught crocodiles for the next 10 years for breeding purposes. Many of the bred animals were then released into the wild.

In his documentaries Rob Bredl introduces a large variety of Australian Outback animals.

== Barefoot Bushman ==
Rob Bredl got his nickname "barefoot bushman" because he has the habit of getting around barefoot, both at home and in the bush, even if he is out catching crocodiles.

The oldest and original Bredl Zoo "Bredl's Wonder World of Wildlife" is located in Renmark - South Australia. His Barefoot Bushman Wildlife Park "Blue Planet" is located near Airlie Beach, near the Whitsunday Islands in North Queensland. The latest project of the Bredl family is located about 50 km south of Airlie Beach at Midge Point. Bredl's Blue Planet is a wildlife sanctuary in which animals in the wild can be observed on 175 acres. A huge lake and the untouched nature are to give the impression of a mini Kakadu National Park.

On 22 September 2016 Rob Bredl was bitten by a crocodile he was attempting to feed in his "Blue Planet Park". He was taken by Air Ambulance to Hospital for treatment to injuries on one of his hands and thighs.

== Home media ==
Bredl is featured in several DVDs released by Rajon Distribution in Australia in the series "Deadly Predators":

- Snakes - Your number one phobia is here HHO0049
- Crocodiles - Jaws on land HHO0050
- Sharks and Killer Whales - Gliding monsters of the deep HHO0051
- Lizards - The dinosaurs are still with us HHO0053
- The Spiders - Arachnophobia reigns HHO0054
- Marsupial Carnivores - Hunters of the night HHO0055
- Urban Birds of Prey - Murder in the suburbs HHO0056
- Ocean Venom - Gently drifting killers HHO0057
- Pythons - The land of the pythons HHO0058
