= Koala Farm, Adelaide =

Private zoo

Adelaide's Koala Farm (Note: The now-deprecated term "koala bear" was used in its title for most of its existence.) was a private zoo in the city's Park Lands, founded and operated 1936–1960 by (Alfred) Keith Minchin (24 May 1899 – 1 August 1963), a member of the Adelaide Zoo Minchin dynasty. (Note: Keith was a grandson of Richard Ernest Minchin (1831–1893), founder and first director of the Adelaide Zoo, son of Alfred Corker Minchin (1857–1934), director 1893–1934 and brother of R. R. L. "Ron" Minchin (1904–1940), director 1935–1940.) Originally existing as two operations, the Snake Farm in Adelaide and the Koala Bear Farm, 50 miles from Adelaide, merged in 1934.

== History ==
Approximate locations only
1 Snake Park 1927–1934
2 Koala Farm 1934–1960

Minchin was born in Adelaide, son of the director of the Adelaide Zoo, and was educated at St Peter's College. In 1921, he was made responsible for exporting Australian animals to zoos overseas then, in 1924–1925, he went overseas collecting animals for the Zoo. He started a private herpetological collection, with which in March 1927 he founded Adelaide's Snake Park on a 0.2 acres (0.081 ha) section of the Park Lands. The section, which he rented from the Adelaide City Council, lay near Pennington Garden, between the University Oval and King William Road (now part of Park 12/Karrawirra). Part of its mission was to collect snake venom for antivenom serum manufacture, but from 1936, when the Snake Park had been incorporated into the Koala Farm, only non-venomous snakes were held.

In 1931, he contracted polio, which left him crippled and dependent on crutches, later a wheelchair.

He had a property 50 miles (80 km) somewhere north of Adelaide, where he bred (Note: Minchin successfully bred koalas but was not the first in Adelaide to do so; that was Tom Paine Bellchambers (died 1929) in 1927.) and studied koalas that he progressively introduced to the Snake Park, which in March 1934 become a section of the "Koala Bear Farm". In 1936, he applied to the Council for an increase in area for the "Farm" to around one acre.

The source of his first koalas has not yet been found. The species was not uncommon in South Australia before the arrival of foxes and "sportsmen" with rifles, but 100 years later was believed locally extinct apart from three discrete locations not divulged to the public. Minchin may have received some of those brought into South Australia from Queensland in 1937.

The "Farm" was popular with children, as apart from koalas and snakes, it boasted "Sally" the Timor pony, "Porker" the buckjumping pig, and a performing seal in its own pool with a 30 feet (9.1 m) diving tower. Minchin attracted celebrity visitors, including Noël Coward and the Duke and Duchess of Kent. Among other attractions was a blubber melting pot, a relic of whaling days, which Minchin recovered from Kangaroo Island, and a renovated coach, originally owned by Governor Hindmarsh, drawn by Timor ponies.

In the 1930s, Minchin made substantial donations to the Adelaide Zoo, of which his brother Ronald was director. The "monkey paddock", open to the sky and holding some 50 rhesus monkeys, was his gift, and its popularity helped reverse the zoo's fortunes. Minchin's other enterprises include an Aquarium (1933–1946) on the Glenelg jetty.

Minchin never married; he died on 1 August 1963 and was buried at the North Road Cemetery near the grave of his father.

== Legacy ==
As a result of his breeding program, Minchin was able to release many koala families into the wild, notably along the Willson River, near Penneshaw, Kangaroo Island. They were a considerable tourist attraction to the island until the late 1990s when, due to overpopulation, both koalas and the manna gums, on which they relied for food, were visibly dying. Scientists recommended a significant culling, but rather than risk a hostile public reaction, the South Australian Government embarked on a program of surgical sterilization of adult females by veterinarians.

== See also ==
- Koala Park Sanctuary, Sydney
- Lone Pine Koala Sanctuary, Brisbane
