= Noel Burnet =

Australian environmentalist and zookeeper

Noel Burnet F.R.Z.S.
- Born: 4 March 1904; Ashfield, New South Wales
- Died: 24 June 1953 (aged 49); West Pennant Hills, New South Wales
- Education: Newington College
- Occupation: Wildlife park proprietor
- Spouse: Emily (née Lucas)
- Children: 3 sons and 1 daughter
- Parent(s): Charles Alfred Burnet and Kathleen (née Bradley)

Noel Burnet (4 March 1904 – 24 June 1953) was an Australian environmentalist and founder of the Koala Park Sanctuary, a privately owned and run wildlife park located at West Pennant Hills, New South Wales, Australia. He was a Fellow of the Royal Zoological Society of New South Wales.

== Biography ==
Burnet was born in Sydney, the first of three children of Kathleen (née Bradley) and Charles Alfred Burnet. He attended Newington College from 1916 until 1921 during the headmastership of the Rev Dr Charles Prescott. Burnet studied on the modern side and passed exams in history, geography, business principles, shorthand, woodwork and art in the Intermediate Certificate in 1920 from Form IVB. That year he was awarded a prize for woodwork. He remained at Newington for another year but didn’t sit the Leaving Certificate. In 1921 he was awarded prizes for shorthand and business principles. After finishing high school Burnet was living in Brisbane when he first came into contact with koalas. He was a resident of a boarding-house when he was given his first pair of koalas and he placed them on a tree in the garden. Fortunately, the tree was of the right species upon which the koalas thrived. After moving back to Sydney he established Koala Park later in the decade and in 1929 he married Emily Lucas. In 1930 he opened the Koala Park Sanctuary to the public. On his death he was survived by his wife, three sons and a daughter, who carried on the management of the Koala Park Sanctuary.

== Publications ==
- The native bear book of Australia (Sydney : W.A. Pepperday & Co, 1934.)
- Some Australian fauna (Sydney : W.A. Pepperday & Co., 1932.)
- The Bluegum family at Koala Park (Sydney : W.A. Pepperday & Co., 1932.)
