= James Minchin =

Australian cricketer

Personal information
- Born: 15 August 1858; Melbourne, Australia
- Died: 13 February 1919 (aged 60); Heatherton, Victoria, Australia

Domestic team information
- Years: Team
- 1882: Victoria
- Source: Cricinfo, 23 July 2015

James Minchin (15 August 1858 – 13 February 1919) was an Australian cricketer. He played one first-class cricket match for Victoria in 1882.

== See also ==
- List of Victoria first-class cricketers
