= A. C. Minchin =

Australian zoo director

Alfred Corker Minchin (24 September 1857 – 20 September 1934) was director of the Adelaide Zoological Gardens from 1893 to 1934.

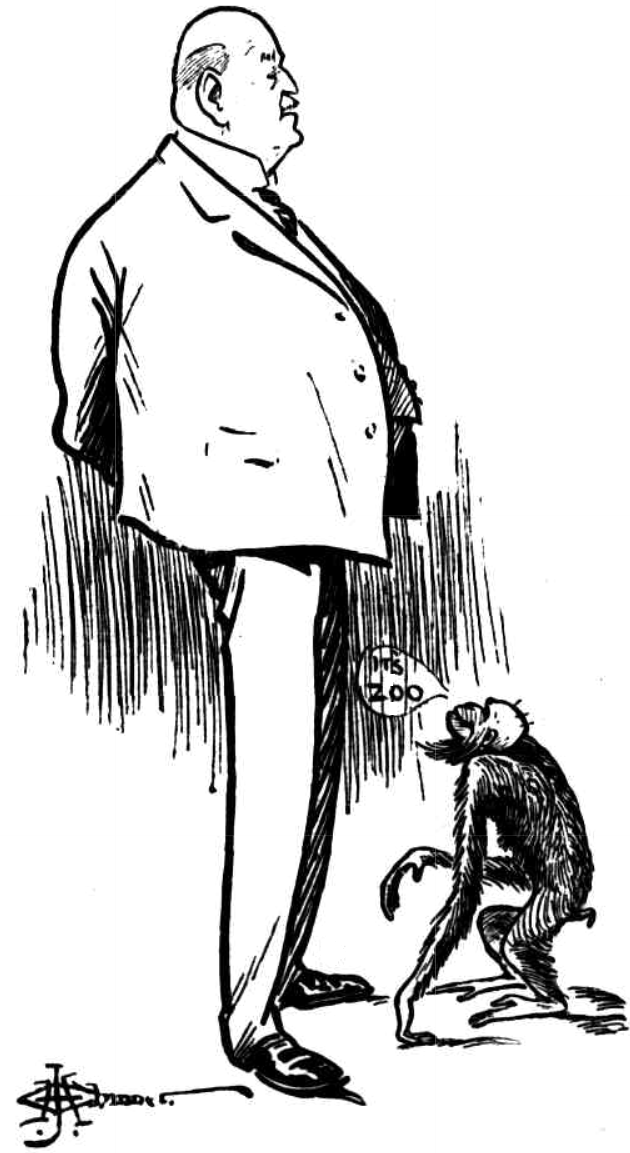
caricature by J. H. Chinner

== History ==
Minchin was born in Geelong, Victoria to Richard Ernest Minchin (5 March 1831 – 4 January 1893), founder of the Adelaide Zoo, and his first wife Ellen Rebecca Minchin, née Ocock (died 6 July 1882). He accompanied his parents to Western Australia with the gold boom, and they then settled in South Australia where his father had secured a clerical position in the public service and he attended the North Adelaide Grammar School. He worked for a time at the office of Green & Co., then in a sharebroking business before his father was appointed director of the zoological garden and decided to join him. He spent some time at the Melbourne Zoo gaining experience in animal management. He was present at the Zoo's official opening by the Governor, Sir William Robinson, in 1879, and worked as assistant to his father, acting as director during his father's several overseas trips in search of interesting specimens.

He was successful in finding wealthy sponsors such as Thomas Elder, who funded the great rotunda.

He purchased the Zoo's first elephant, "Miss Siam", and greatly enlarged the lion and tiger enclosures and the deer park.

He developed the bird collection, especially of Australian species, into one of the best in Australia.

He died at home, having been confined to his room with heart trouble since June. His remains were interred at the North Road Cemetery. The zoo's green Amazon parrot was the only animal to outlive his tenure, having been purchased by his father.

== Family ==
Minchin married Florence Euphemia Scammell (1888–1950), a daughter of Luther Scammell, on 9 October 1888. They had three children.
