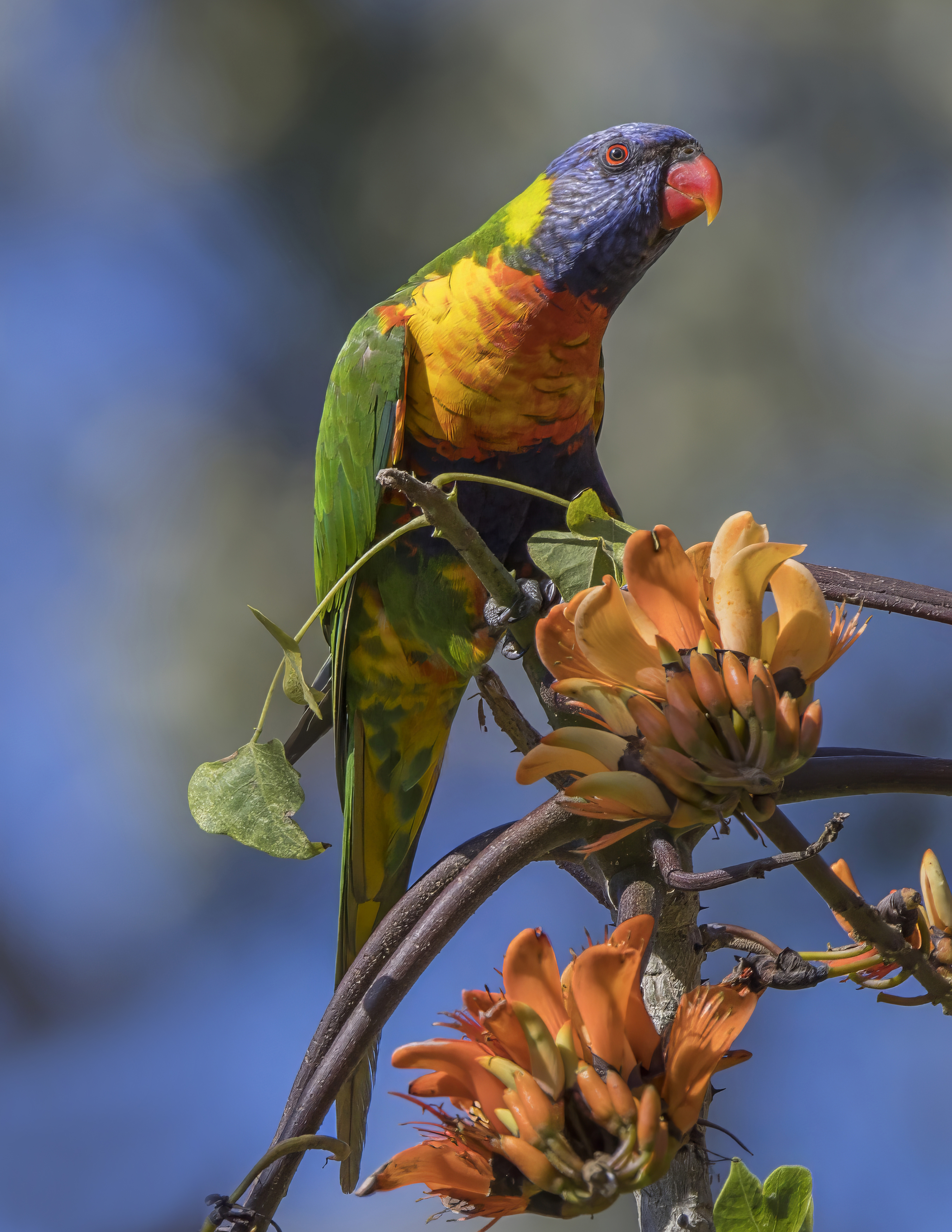
- Royal Botanic Gardens, Sydney

Conservation status
- Least Concern (IUCN 3.1)

Scientific classification
- Kingdom: Animalia
- Phylum: Chordata
- Class: Aves
- Order: Psittaciformes
- Family: Psittaculidae
- Genus: Trichoglossus
- Species: T. moluccanus

Binomial name
- Trichoglossus moluccanus (Gmelin, 1788)

= Rainbow lorikeet =

Species of bird

The rainbow lorikeet (Trichoglossus moluccanus) is a species of parrot found in Australia. It is common along the eastern seaboard, from northern Queensland to South Australia. Its habitat is rainforest, coastal bush, and woodland areas. Six taxa traditionally listed as subspecies of the rainbow lorikeet are now treated as separate species (see Taxonomy).

Rainbow lorikeets have been introduced to Perth, Western Australia; Tasmania; Auckland, New Zealand; and Hong Kong.

== Taxonomy ==
The rainbow lorikeet was formally listed in 1788 by German naturalist Johann Friedrich Gmelin under the binomial name Psittacus moluccanus. Gmelin cited French polymath Georges-Louis Leclerc, Comte de Buffon, who in 1779 had published a description of "La Perruche à Face Bleue" in his Histoire Naturelle des Oiseaux. The species was illustrated as the "Perruche d'Amboine" and as the "Perruche des Moluques". Gmelin was misled and coined the specific epithet moluccanus as he believed the specimens had come from the Moluccas. The type locality was changed to Botany Bay in Australia by Gregory Mathews in 1916. The rainbow lorikeet is now placed in the genus Trichoglossus that was introduced in 1826 by English naturalist James Francis Stephens.

Two subspecies are recognised:

Image	Subspecies	Distribution
	T. m. septentrionalis Robinson, 1900	Cape York Peninsula (northeast Australia)
	T. m. moluccanus (Gmelin, JF, 1788)	Australia (except Cape York Peninsula) and Tasmania

The rainbow lorikeet has often included the red-collared lorikeet (T. rubritorquis) as a subspecies, but today, most major authorities consider it separate. Additionally, a review in 1997 led to the recommendation of splitting off some of the most distinctive taxa from the Lesser Sundas as separate species, these being the scarlet-breasted lorikeet (T. forsteni), the marigold lorikeet (T. capistratus) and the Flores lorikeet (T. weberi). This is increasingly followed by major authorities. In 2019 The rainbow lorikeet in Australia was split into three: rainbow, coconut (T. haematodus) and red-collared lorikeets (T. rubritorquis).

Three syntypes of Trichoglossus novaehollandiae septentrionalis Robinson (Bull. Liverpool Mus., 2, 1900, p.115) are held in the vertebrate zoology collection of National Museums Liverpool at World Museum, with accession numbers NML-VZ 23.7.1900.4, NML-VZ 23.7.1900.4a, and NML-VZ 23.7.1900.4b. The specimens were collected in Cooktown, Queensland, Australia by E. Olive. The specimens came to the Liverpool national collection via purchase from H. C. Robinson.

== Range and habitat ==
The rainbow lorikeet is found along the east coast of Australia, from northern Queensland south through New South Wales and then west through Victoria and South Australia. It inhabits forest, shrubland, wetlands and some artificial habitats.

== Description ==
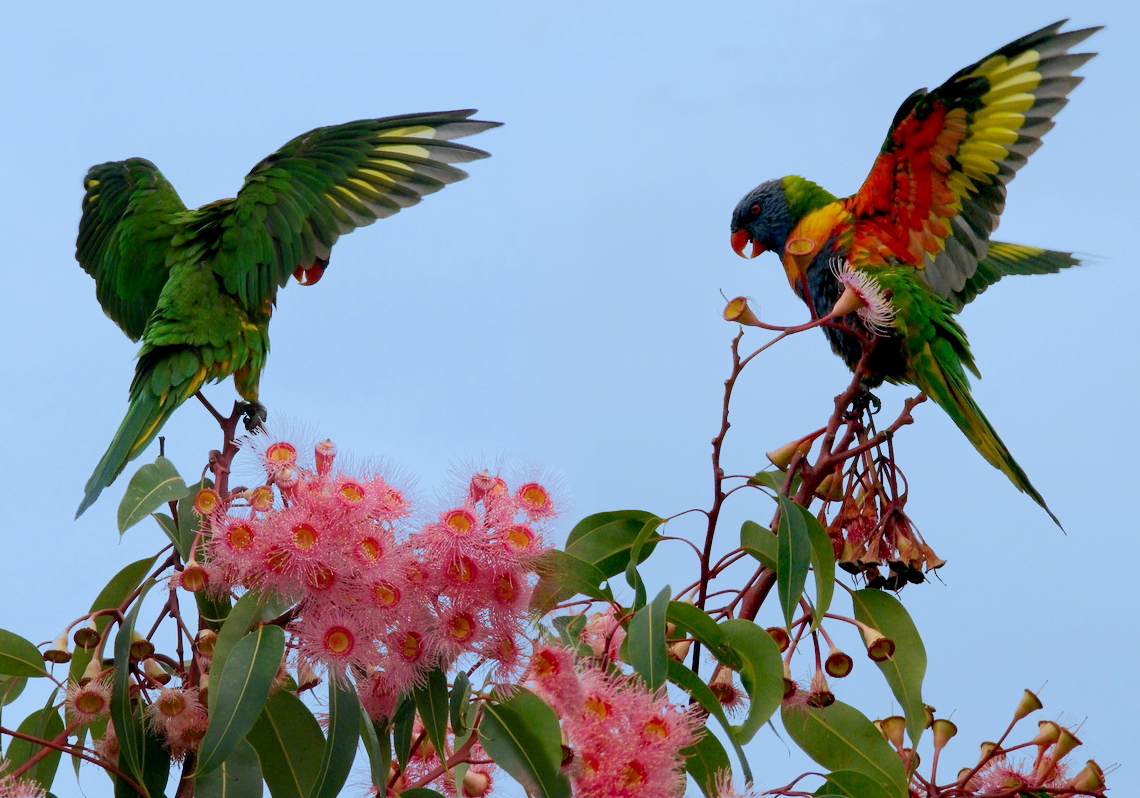
In Brisbane, Queensland

The rainbow lorikeet is a medium-sized parrot, with the length ranging from 25 to 30 cm (9.8 to 11.8 in), including the tail, and the weight varies from 75 to 157 g (2.6–5.5 oz). The plumage of the nominate race, as with all subspecies, is very bright and colorful. The head is deep blue with a greenish-yellow nuchal collar, and the rest of the upper parts (wings, back, and tail) are green. The chest is orange/yellow. The belly is deep blue, and the thighs and rump are green. In flight, a yellow wing-bar contrasts clearly with the red underwing coverts. Little exists to visually distinguish between the sexes.

Juveniles have a black beak, which gradually brightens to orange in the adults.

The markings of T. moluccanus resemble those of the coconut lorikeet (T. haematodus), but with a blue belly and a more orange breast with little or no blue-black barring.

Unlike some parrots, such as the eclectus parrot, rainbow lorikeets do not have any immediately discernible dimorphic traits. Males and females look identical, and surgical sexing by a veterinarian or DNA analysis of a feather is used to determine the sex of an individual.

== Diet ==
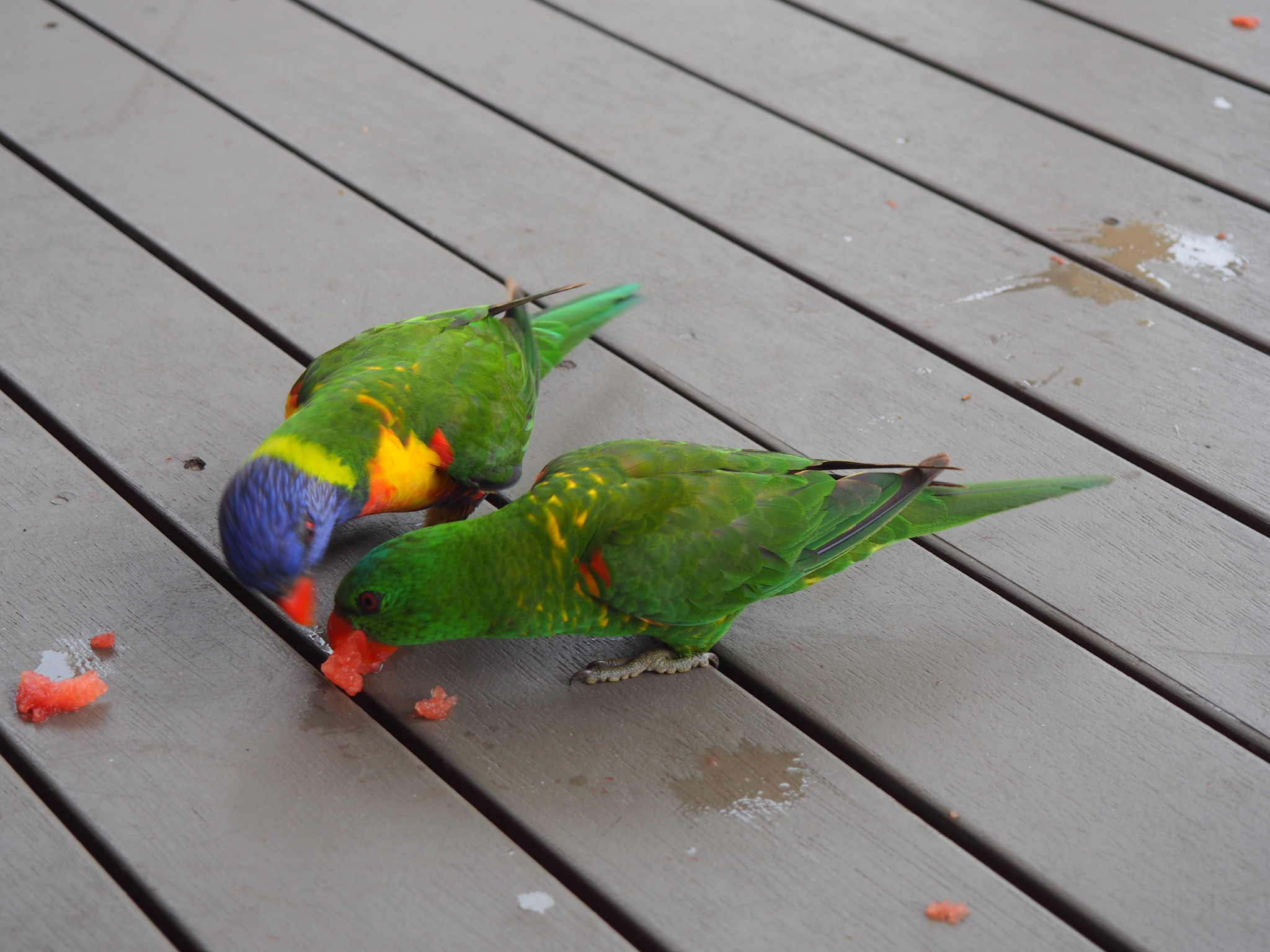
Eating watermelon with a scaly-breasted lorikeet

Rainbow lorikeets feed mainly on fruit, pollen, and nectar and possess a tongue adapted especially for their particular diet. The end of the tongue is equipped with a papillate appendage adapted to gathering pollen and nectar from flowers. Nectar from eucalyptus is important in Australia, other important nectar sources are Pittosporum, Grevillea, Spathodea campanulata (African tulip-tree), and Metroxylon sagu (sago palm). In Melanesia, coconuts are very important food sources, and rainbow lorikeets are important pollinators of these. They also consume the fruits of Ficus, Trema, and Muntingia genera, as well as papaya and mangoes already opened by fruit bats. They also eat crops such as apples, and raid maize and sorghum. They are also frequent visitors at bird feeders placed in gardens, which supply store-bought nectar, sunflower seeds, and fruits such as apples, grapes, and pears.

In many places, including campsites and suburban gardens, wild lorikeets are so used to humans that they can be hand-fed. The Currumbin Wildlife Sanctuary in Queensland is noted for its thousands of lorikeets. Around 8 am and 4 pm each day, the birds gather in a huge, noisy flock in the park's main area. Visitors are encouraged to feed them a specially prepared nectar, and the birds often happily settle on people's arms and heads to consume it. Wild rainbow lorikeets can also be hand-fed by visitors at Lone Pine Koala Sanctuary in Brisbane, Queensland.

Semitame lorikeets are common daily visitors in many Sydney backyards, though many people, ignorant of their dietary requirements, feed them bread or bread coated with honey. This is an inadequate source of the nutrients, vitamins, and minerals that the rainbow lorikeet requires and can lead to health and feather-formation issues in young lorikeets. Packet mixes with a nutritional mix suitable for feeding lorikeets are generally available from veterinarians and pet shops.

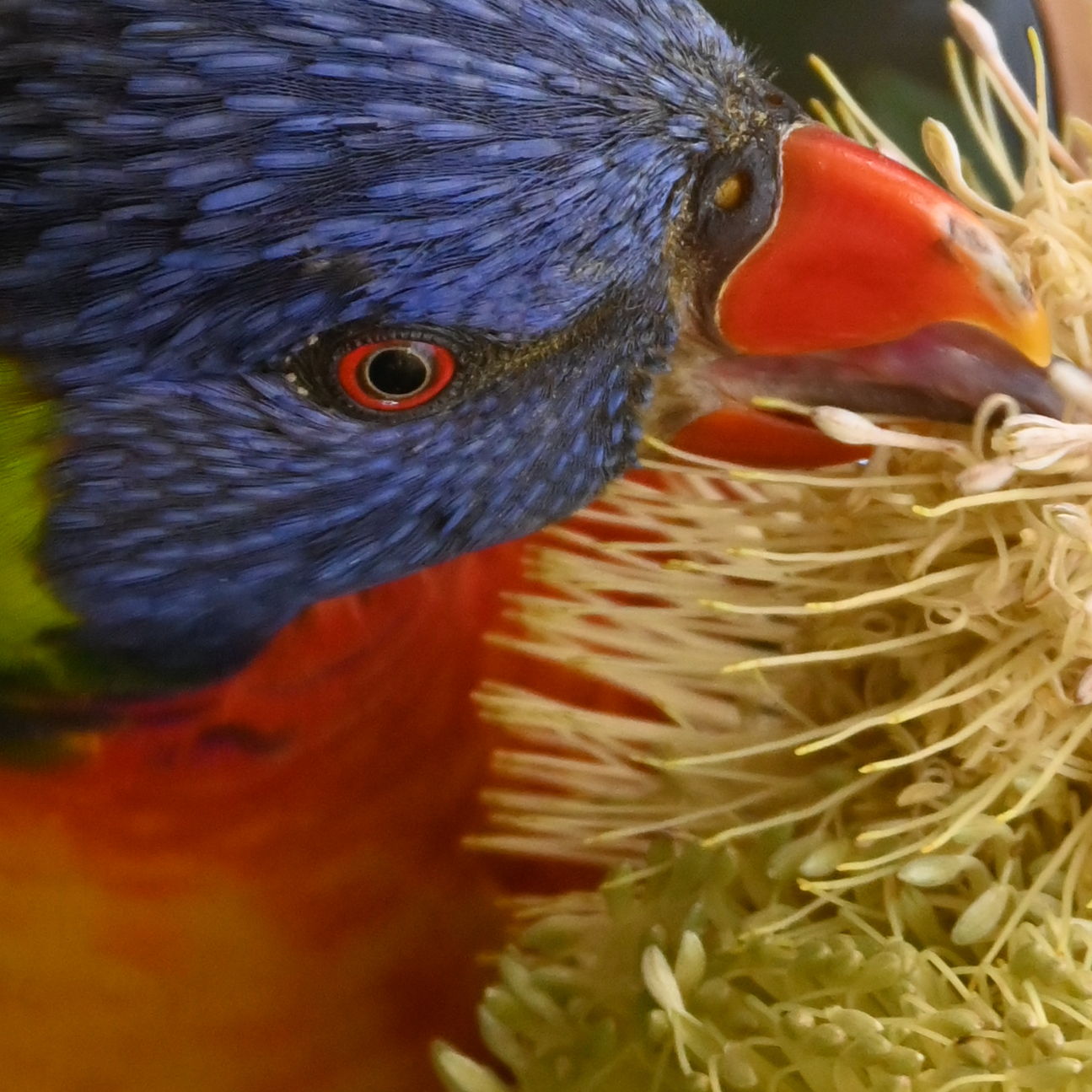
Drinking Banksia nectar

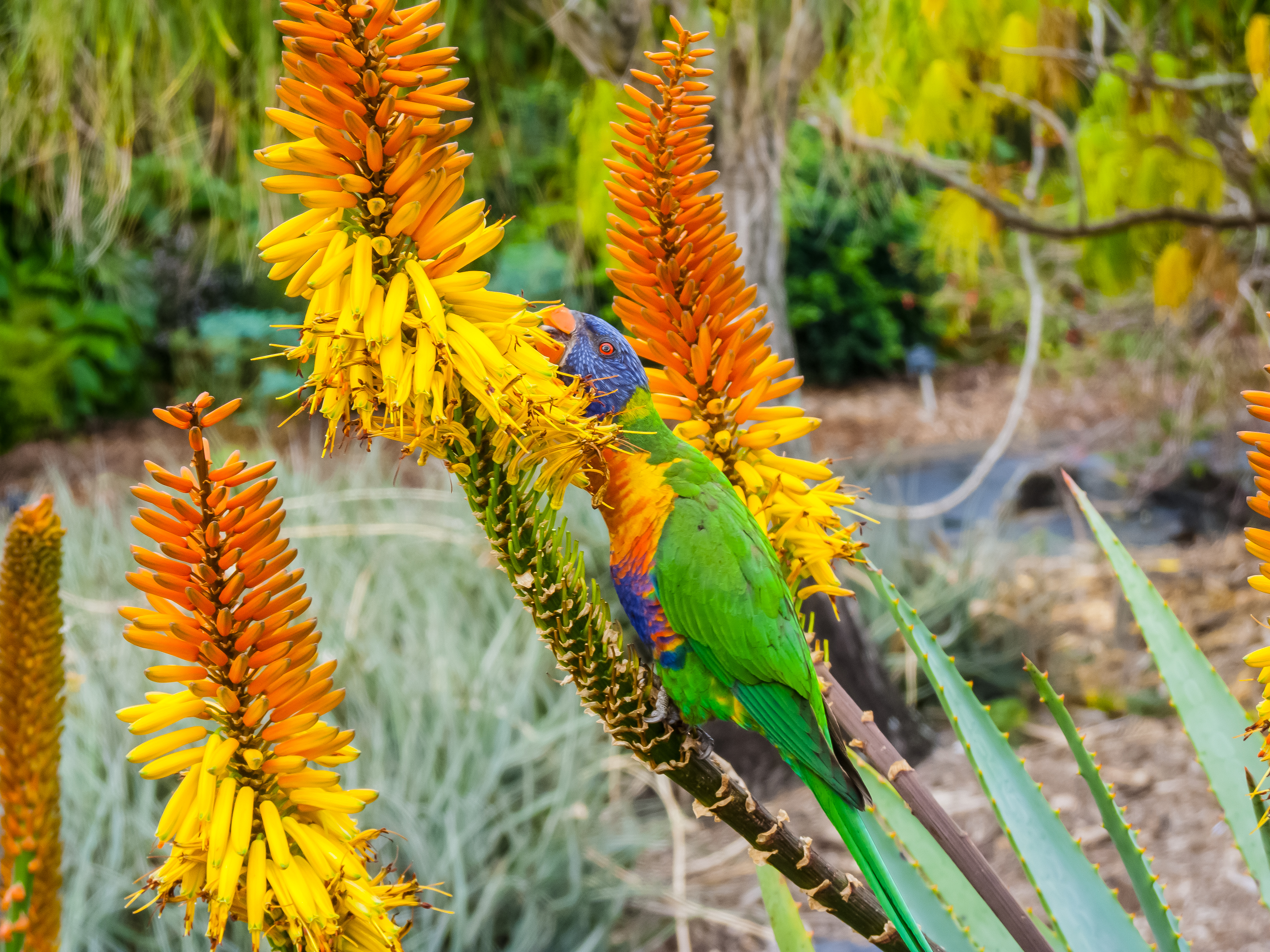
Drinking Aloe nectar

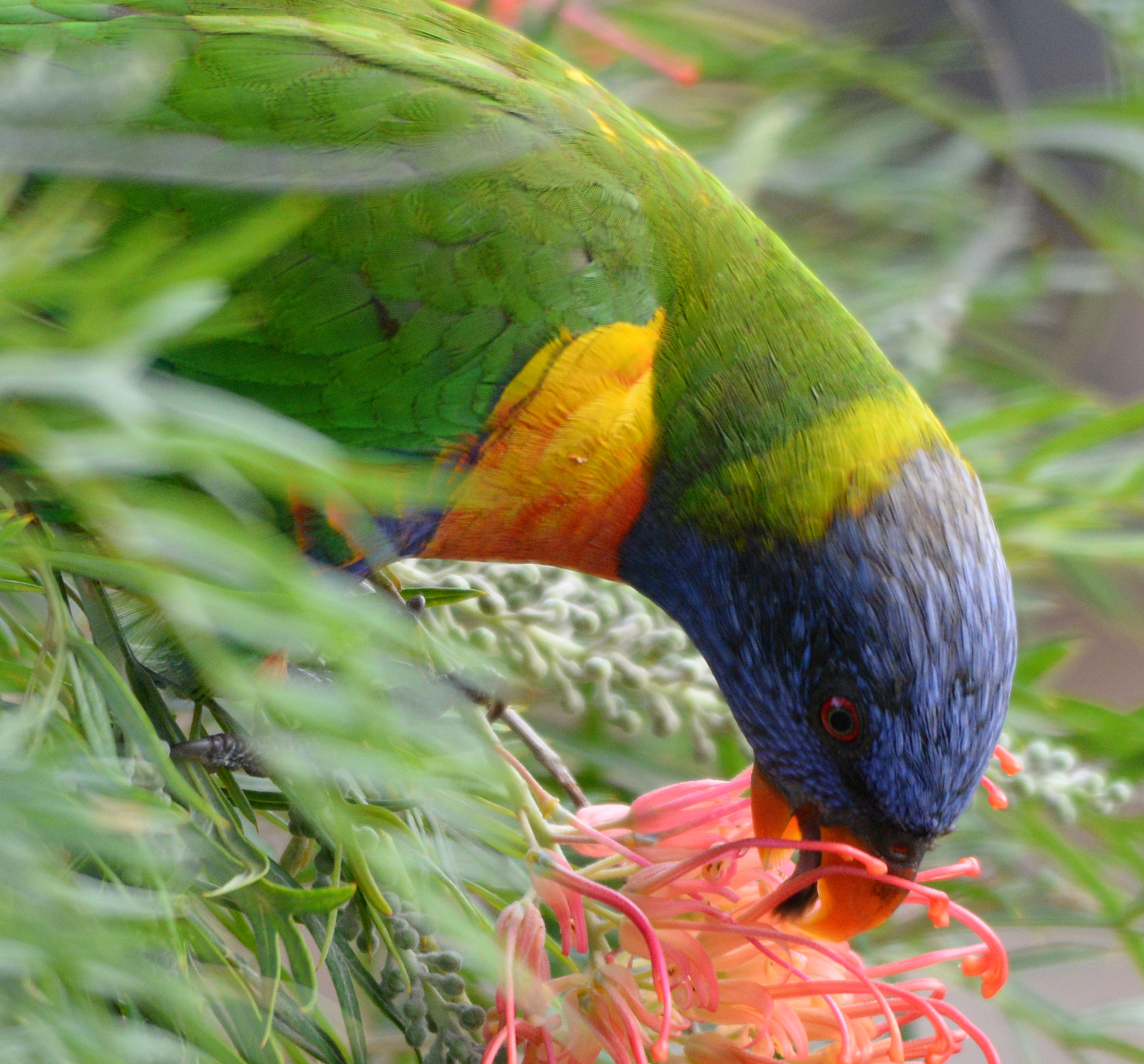
Drinking Grevillea nectar

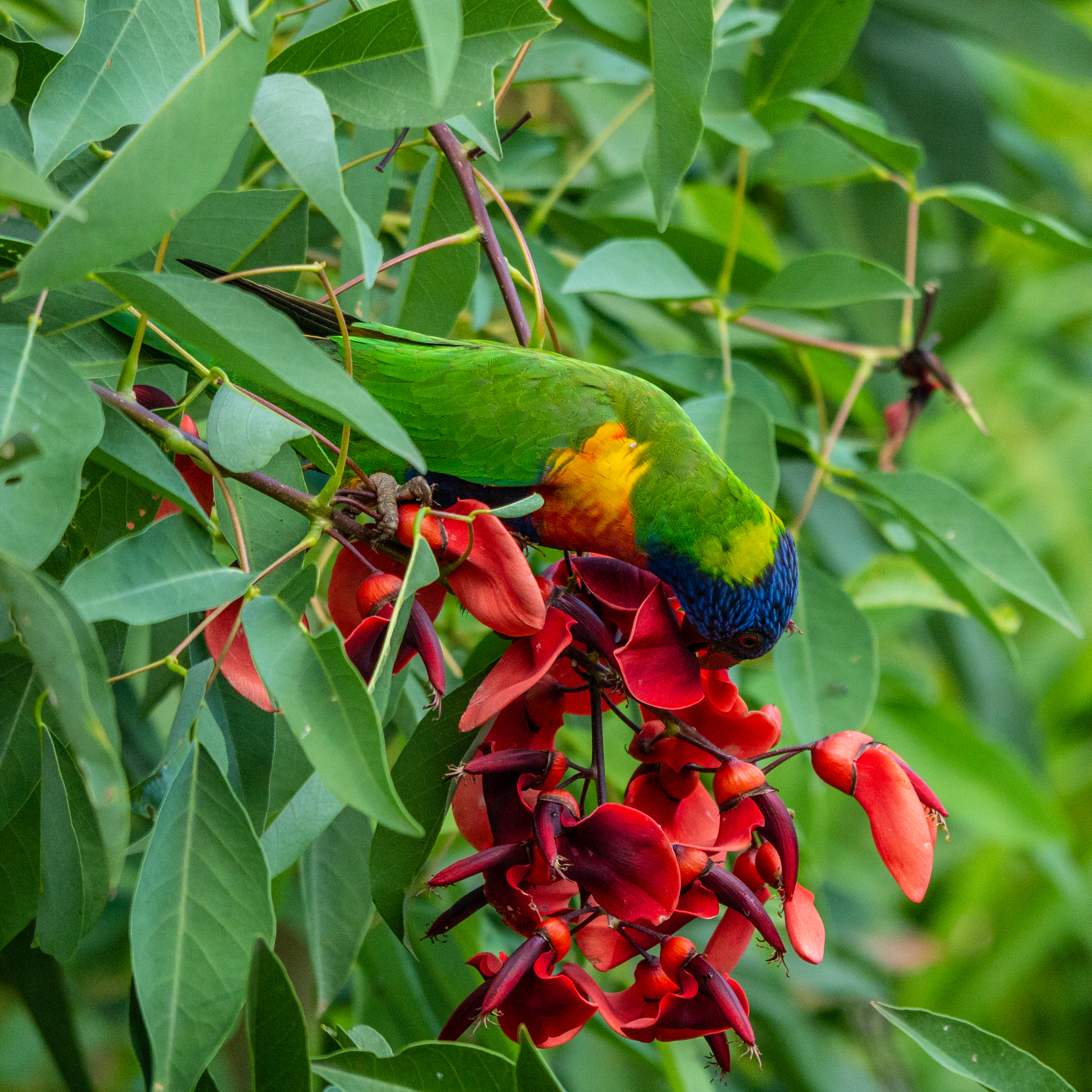
Drinking Erythrina crista-galli nectar

== Breeding ==
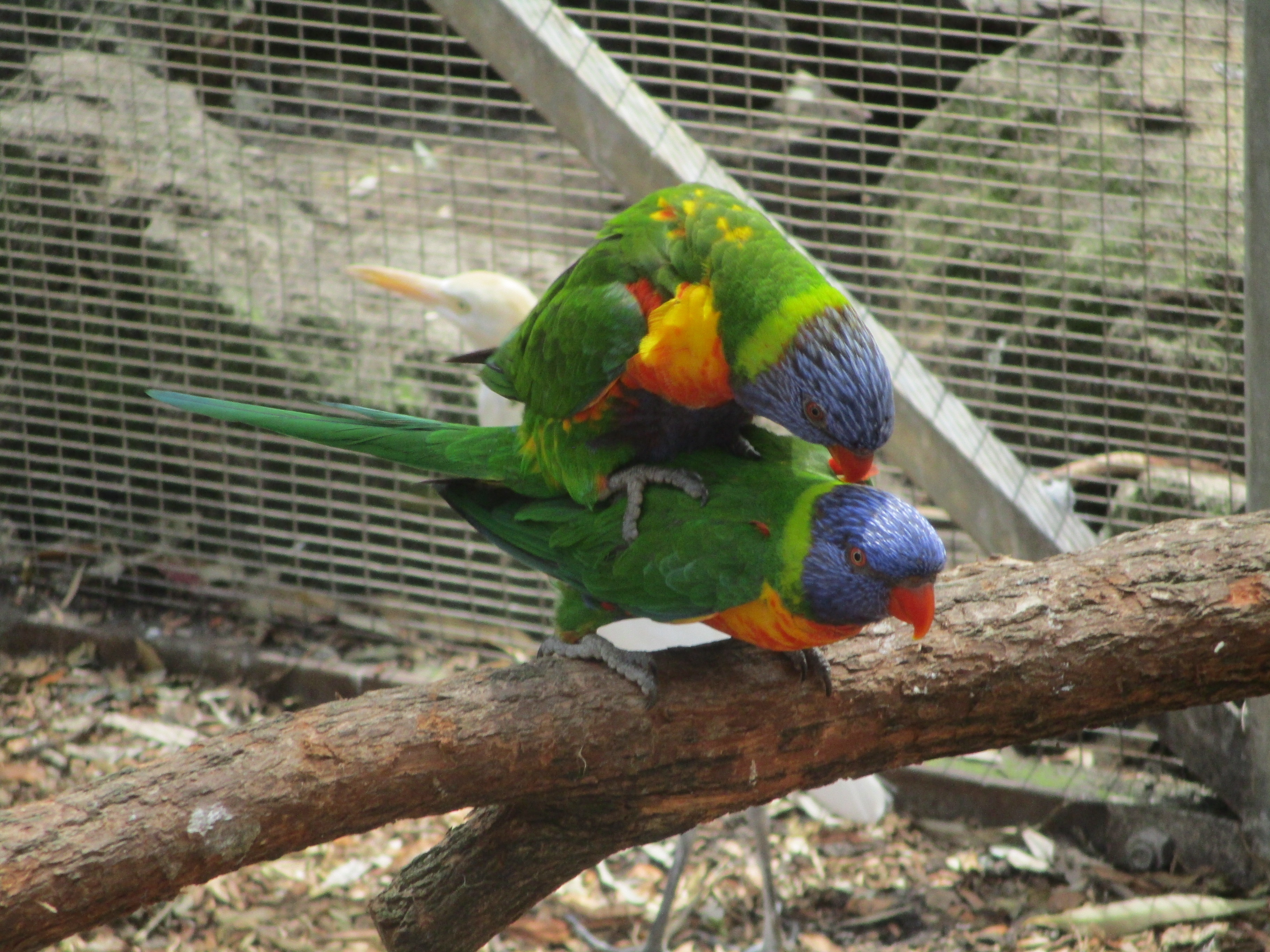
Rainbow lorikeets mating at Peel Zoo, Western Australia

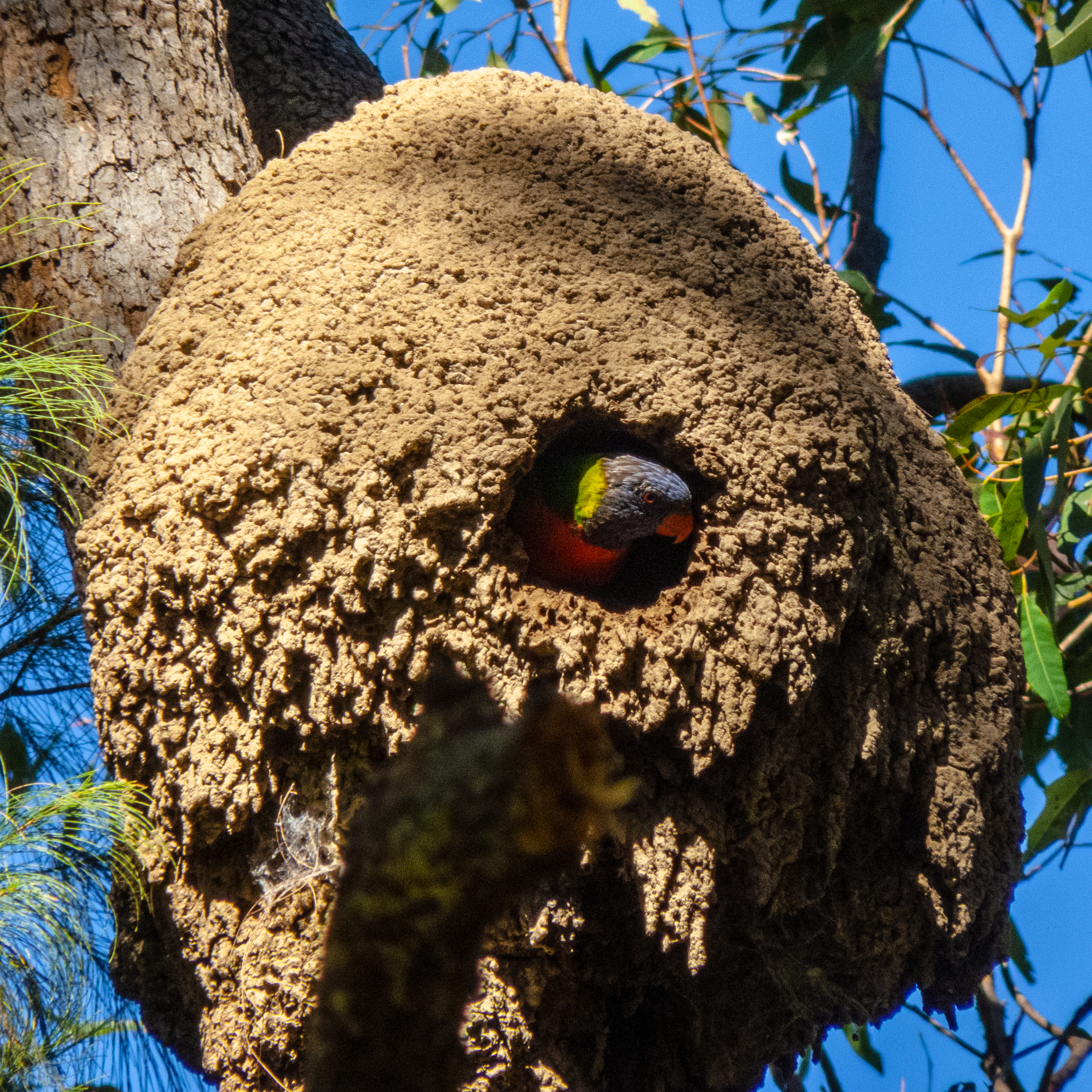
In a termite nest

In southern Australia, breeding usually occurs from late winter to early summer (August to January). Elsewhere in Australia, breeding has been recorded in every month except March, varying from region to region due to changes in food availability and climate. Nesting sites are variable and can include hollows of tall trees such as eucalypts, palm trunks, or overhanging rock. One population in the Admiralty Islands nests in holes in the ground on predator-free islets. Pairs sometimes nest in the same tree with other rainbow lorikeet pairs, or other bird species. The clutch size is between one and three eggs, which are incubated for around 25 days. Incubation duties are carried out by the female alone.

Rainbow lorikeets are mostly monogamous and remain paired for long periods, if not for life.

== Status ==
Overall, the rainbow lorikeet remains widespread and often common. According to the annual Birdlife Australia census, it is the most commonly observed bird in Australia. It is therefore considered to be of least concern by BirdLife International. The status for some localised subspecies is more precarious, with especially T. h. rosenbergii, the Biak lorikeet (which possibly is worthy of treatment as a separate species), being threatened by habitat loss and capture for the parrot trade.

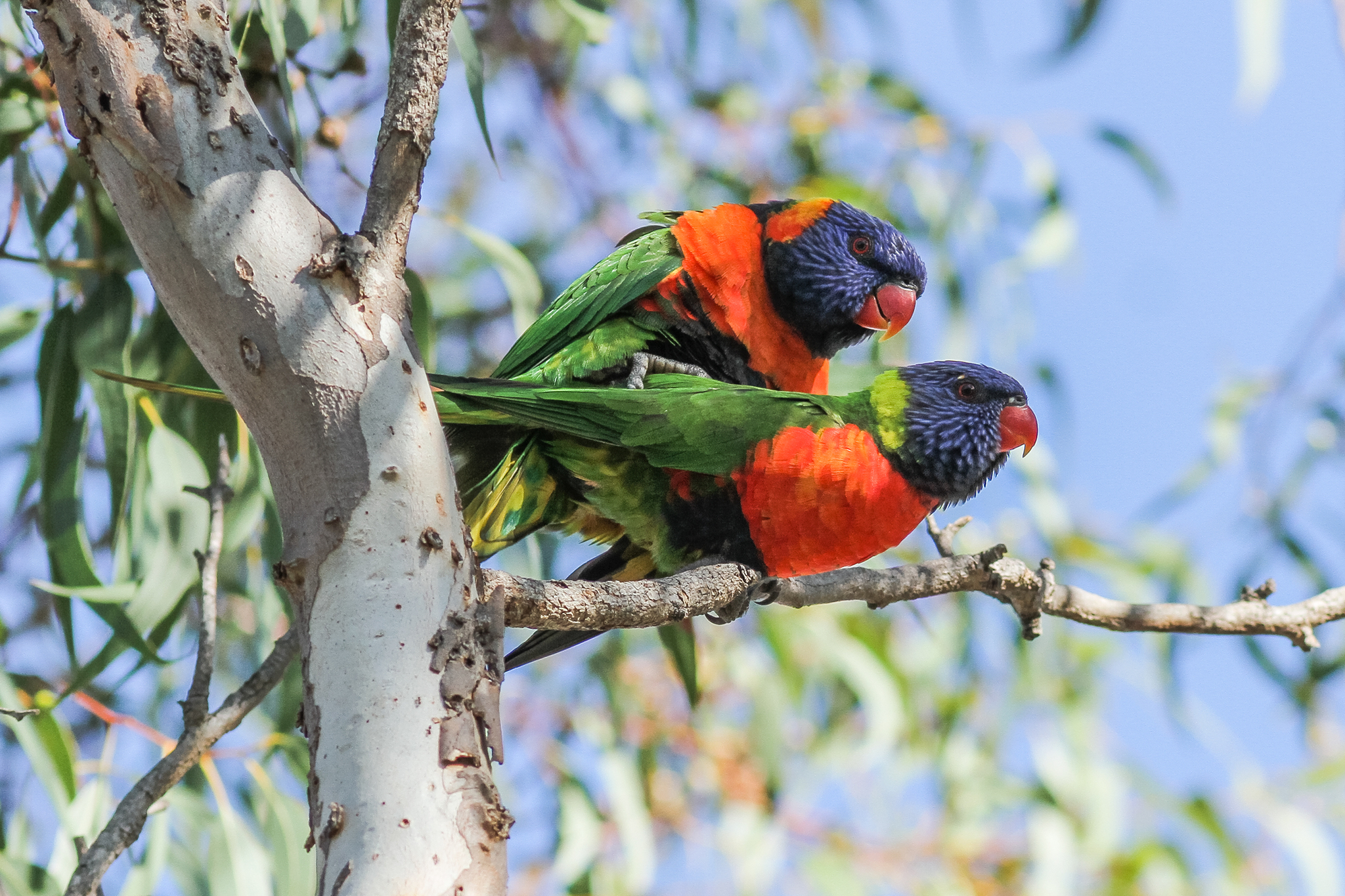
Red-collared (top) and rainbow lorikeet (bottom) mating, in Perth, where both are introduced species

=== As a pest ===
Many fruit orchard owners consider them a pest, as they often fly in groups and strip trees containing fresh fruit. In urban areas, the birds create nuisance noise and foul outdoor areas and vehicles with droppings.

The rainbow lorikeet was accidentally released into the southwest of Western Australia near the University of Western Australia in the 1960s, and they have since been classified as a pest. They have a major impact there by competing with indigenous bird species, including domination of food sources and competition for increasingly scarce nesting hollows. Bird species such as the purple-crowned lorikeet, Carnaby's black cockatoo, and the Australian ringneck are adversely affected or displaced.

A feral population was established in New Zealand after a resident of the North Shore, Auckland, illegally released significant numbers of captive-reared birds in the area in the 1990s, which started breeding in the wild. By 1999, a self-sustaining feral population of 150–200 birds had been established in the region, proving that they could survive and adapt to the New Zealand environment. The Department of Conservation, concerned that rainbow lorikeets would outcompete native honeyeaters and by the possible threat to pristine island habitats such as Little Barrier Island, began eradicating the feral population in 2000. The Ministry for Primary Industries Bio-security, in partnership with DOC and regional councils, now manages rainbow lorikeets under the National Interest Pest Responses initiative. The aim of the response is to prevent rainbow lorikeets from becoming established in the wild. Late in 2010, five of these birds were discovered living in the Mount Maunganui area. They were fed for a few days before being trapped by a Ministry of Agriculture and Fisheries contractor.

== Diseases ==
=== Lorikeet paralysis syndrome ===
A syndrome of uncertain etiology affects rainbow lorikeets every year; in southeast Queensland and northeast New South Wales, thousands become paralysed, most significantly, unable to fly or eat. Because this problem is highly seasonal—occurring only October–June and most intensively December–February—this likely is a form of plant poisoning. This pattern suggests it is due to the fruits of an unknown plant, which only blooms from the spring to autumn, and most intensively in the summer.
