= R. E. Minchin =

Australian zoo administrator and artist

Richard Ernest Minchin
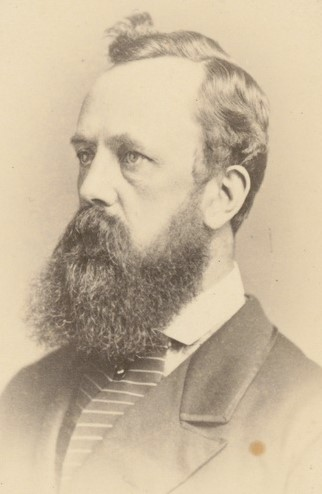
- Minchin, c. 1867
- Born: March 5, 1831
- Died: January 4, 1893 (aged 61); Mount Barker, South Australia
- Occupations: Zoo administrator; artist
- Employer: Adelaide Zoo
- Known for: Founding director of Adelaide Zoo
- Title: Director
- Term: 1883–1893
- Successor: Alfred Corker Minchin
- Spouses: Ellen Rebecca Ocock (m. 1854; died 1882); Ellison Barbara Christina Macgeorge (m. 1883)
- Children: 9, including Alfred Corker Minchin

Richard Ernest Minchin (5 March 1831 – 4 January 1893; aged 61), generally known as R. E. Minchin, was a zoo administrator and artist in South Australia.

== History ==
Minchin was the eighth son of Mary Anne (Wright) and the (Anglican) Rev. William Minchin, rector of Dunkerrin and owner of Greenhills or Greenhill, County Cork. The family sold up and left for various countries: Richard and his brother Henry Paul Minchin (1826–1909) left for South Australia on the Stag in 1850, with letters of introduction to Sheriff Charles Burton Newenham and pastoralist C. H. Bagot.

Henry, who had studied law, was appointed Stipendiary Magistrate and Protector of Aborigines at Mount Remarkable (he later left for the tea plantations of India). Richard worked on one of Bagot's stations near Kapunda for a time, then around 1854 moved to Victoria, where he served as Clerk of Court at Bacchus Marsh. There he married Ellen Rebecca Ocock, 19 September 1854; they had their first child in Geelong in 1856. They returned to Adelaide, where he landed a clerical job with the Civil Service. A few years later he had risen to the position of draftsman with the Land Titles Office.

Minchin became involved in the South Australian Acclimatization Society, founded by Chief Justice S. J. Way in 1878, and was appointed foundation secretary and treasurer. Members included Joseph Fisher, William Magarey, and Henry Scott of Mount Lofty, who had an extensive songbird collection, Together they fought to have a section of the Botanic Garden set aside as a zoological garden, which succeeded in August 1882, after having collected some 1500 signatures on a petition. Land near the Albert Bridge was allocated for a zoo, and Minchin was appointed its first director. The zoo was officially opened in May 1883 and Thomas Elder was appointed president of the Zoological Society of South Australia. He funded the purchase of an elephant, "Miss Siam", and the large rotunda. A pair of lions were donated by Sir James Fergusson and J. H. Angas. They acquired a variety of other exotic animals and a pair of Tasmanian tigers. Minchin was sent to South East Asia on a purchasing expedition, and returned with a fine collection, and in 1889 was sent to Europe on a similar quest. On his return he settled into the newly established director's residence. He undertook one more trip, to Hong Kong, and there contracted a disease which left him an invalid, eventually forced to retire to Mount Barker, where he died ten days later. His son Alfred Corker Minchin succeeded him as director, serving for over forty years.

== Other activities ==
Minchin was a skilled artist, and employed as a drawing master by Prince Alfred College, and also gave lessons in painting. He was a longtime member of the South Australian Society of Arts, and served as its secretary 1887–1892.

== Family ==
Minchin was twice married; his first wife was Ellen Rebecca Ocock (died 6 July 1882), daughter of a Victorian lawyer. They had three sons and six daughters. He married secondly, on 16 August 1883, to Ellison Barbara Christina "Ellen" Macgeorge (1839 – 1 October 1924), third daughter of Robert Forsyth Macgeorge. Among R. E. Minchin's descendants is comedic musician Tim Minchin.
