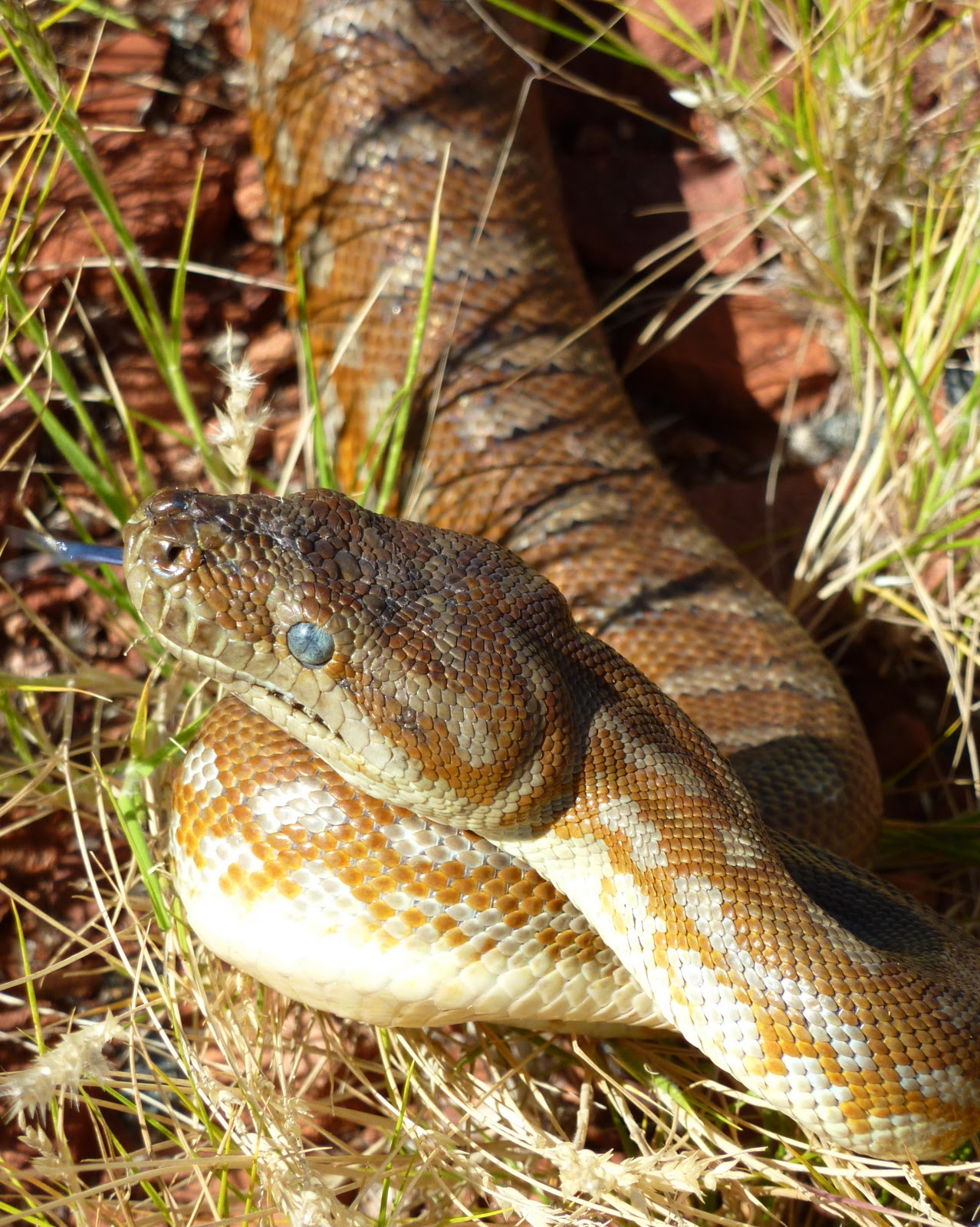

Conservation status
- Least Concern (IUCN 3.1)
- CITES Appendix II

Scientific classification
- Kingdom: Animalia
- Phylum: Chordata
- Class: Reptilia
- Order: Squamata
- Suborder: Serpentes
- Family: Pythonidae
- Genus: Morelia
- Species: M. bredli

Binomial name
- Morelia bredli (Gow, 1981)

Synonyms
- Python bredli Gow, 1981; Morelia bredli — H.G. Cogger, Cameron & H.M. Cogger, 1983

= Morelia bredli =

Species of snake

Morelia bredli is a species of non-venomous snake in the family Pythonidae. The species is endemic to Australia. No subspecies are recognized. Its common names include Bredl's python, the Centralian python, the Centralian carpet python, the central Australian carpet python, Bredl's carpet python, the central Australian Bredl's carpet python, and the central Bredl's carpet python.

== Etymology ==
The specific name bredli is in honor of Australian crocodile conservationist Josef "Joe" Bredl (1948–2007), brother of "the barefoot bushman" Rob Bredl.

== Description ==
Morelia bredli is a slender python that can reach lengths of up to, although rare, 3 meters. The color pattern consists of a brown to reddish ground color with a highly variable pattern of pale intrusions. There are normally black borders around the intrusions that become more extensive around the tail. The belly is yellowish to pale cream.

== Geographic range ==
In Australia, M. bredli is found in the mountains of the southern Northern Territory. The type locality given is "Pitchie Ritchie Park, Alice Springs, Northern Territory, Australia (23°42', 133°51')".

== Habitat ==
M. bredli is found in a variety of habitats, including dry desert, savanna, woodland forest, and freshwater wetlands, preferring to inhabit foothills, ridges, and rocky outcroppings. These animals can be found hunting and resting arboreally (in trees), as well as terrestrially.

== Ecology ==
M. bredli eats birds that nest in tree holes, possums, rock wallaby and occasionally feral cats and rabbits.

== Reproduction ==
M. bredli is oviparous. and may lay between 13-47 eggs

== Gallery ==
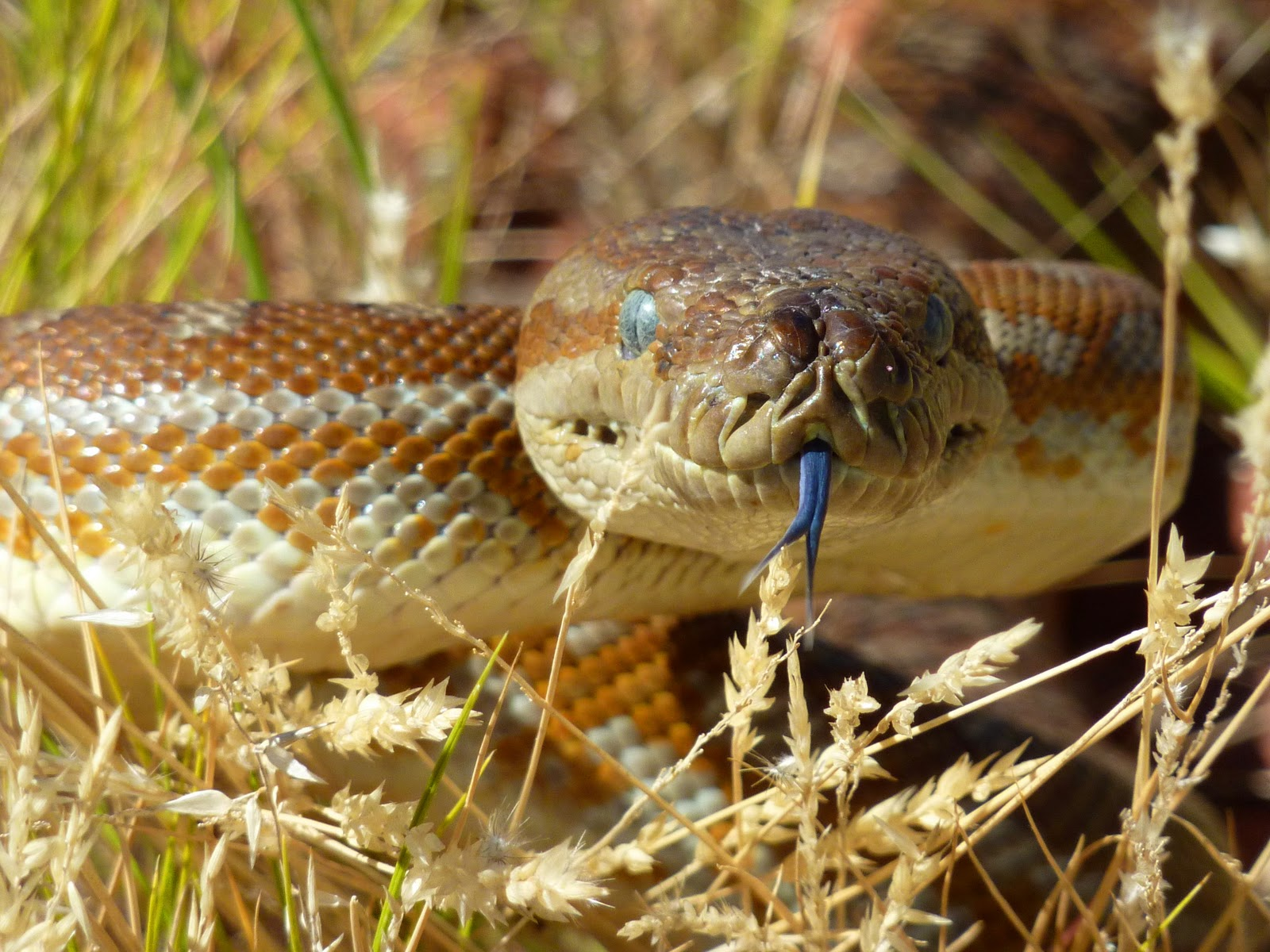
Facial detail, anterior

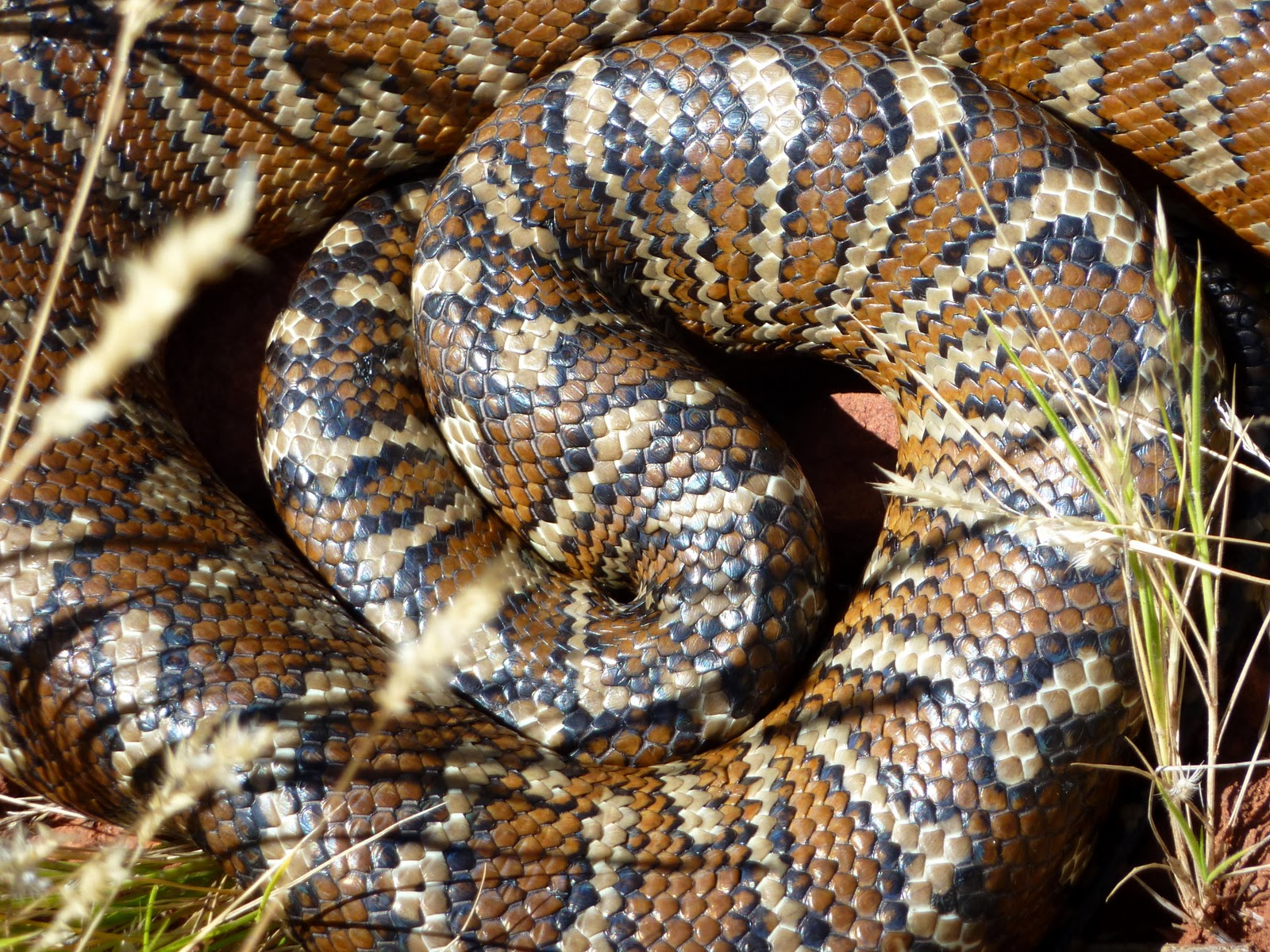
Detail of markings on wild specimen

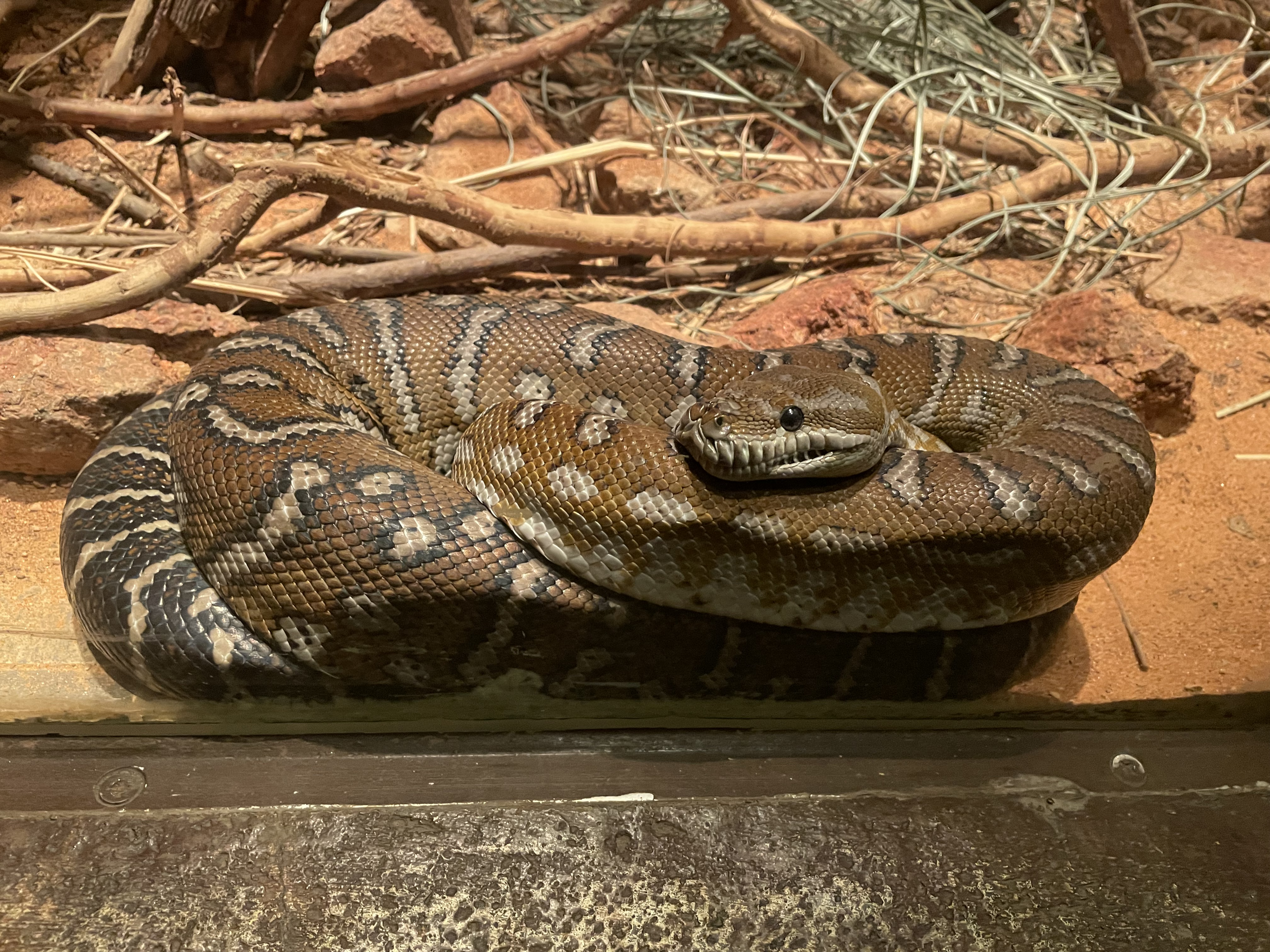
Zoo specimen

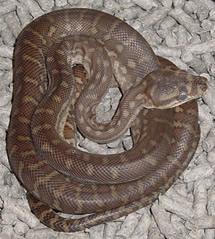
Juvenile
