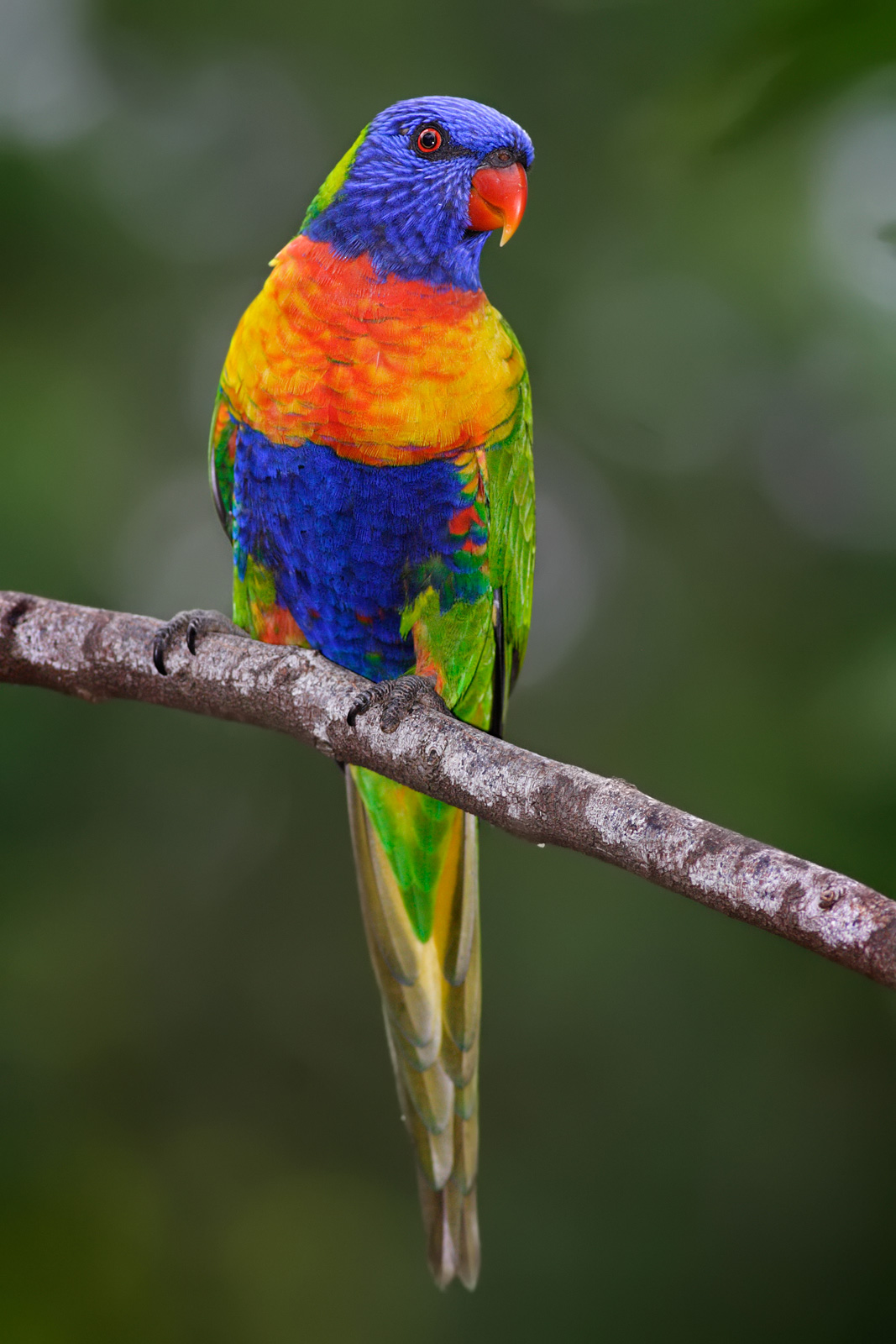
- Rainbow lorikeet (Trichoglossus moluccanus)

Scientific classification
- Domain: Eukaryota
- Kingdom: Animalia
- Phylum: Chordata
- Class: Aves
- Order: Psittaciformes
- Family: Psittaculidae
- Subfamily: Loriinae; Selby, 1836

Tribes
- Cyclopsittini; Loriini; Melopsittacini

= Loriinae =

Subfamily of birds

Loriinae is a subfamily of psittacine birds, one of the six subfamilies that make up the family Psittaculidae. It consists of three tribes, the lories and lorikeets (Loriini), the budgerigar (Melopsittacini) and the fig parrots (Cyclopsittini), which are small birds, mostly of bright colors and inhabitants of Oceania and the islands of Southeast Asia.

== Taxonomy ==
The subfamily Loriinae was introduced in 1836 (as Loriana and Lorianae) by the English naturalist Prideaux John Selby in his book The Natural History of Parrots. Traditionally it was considered that the lories were the only members of the subfamily Loriinae, or were integrated into their own family, Loriidae, but currently they are classified as a tribe, Loriini, within a larger subfamily Loriinae. The genetic studies showed that the lories are closely related to the budgerigar and the fig parrots of the genera Cyclopsitta and Psittaculirostris, that form the other two tribes that make up the subfamily, Melopsittacini and Cyclopsittini, respectively. Loriinae is integrated as one of the five subfamilies of the family Psittaculidae, together with Psittaculinae, Platycercinae, Psittacellinae, Agapornithinae; and in turn Psittaculidae forms together with two families more the superfamily Psittacoidea.

== Genera ==
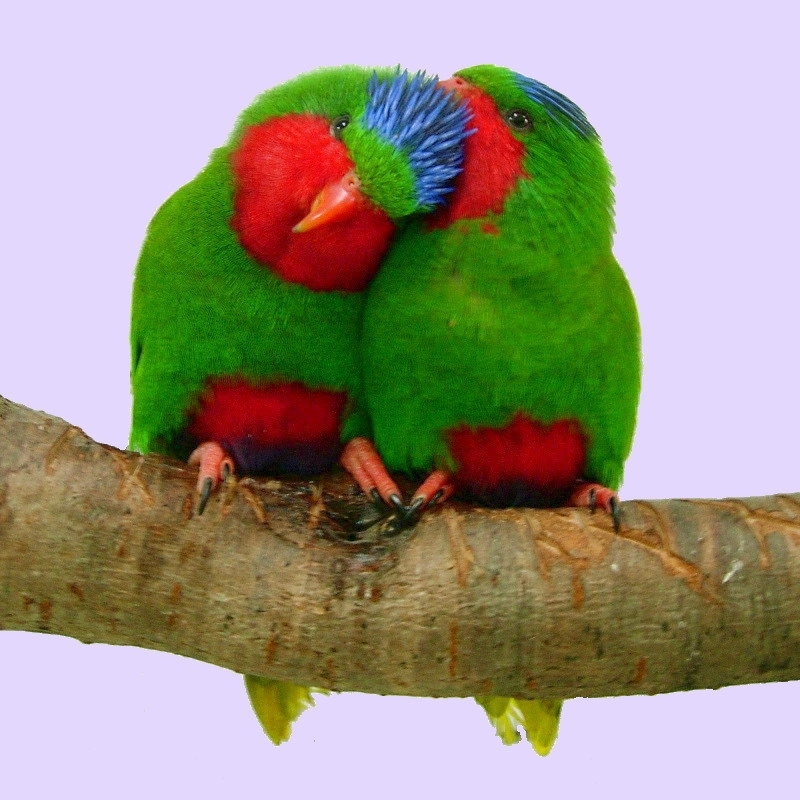
Vini australis

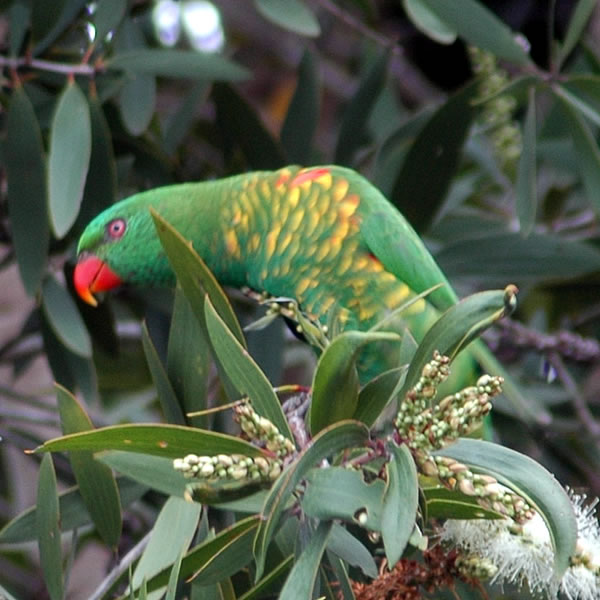
Trichoglossus chlorolepidotus

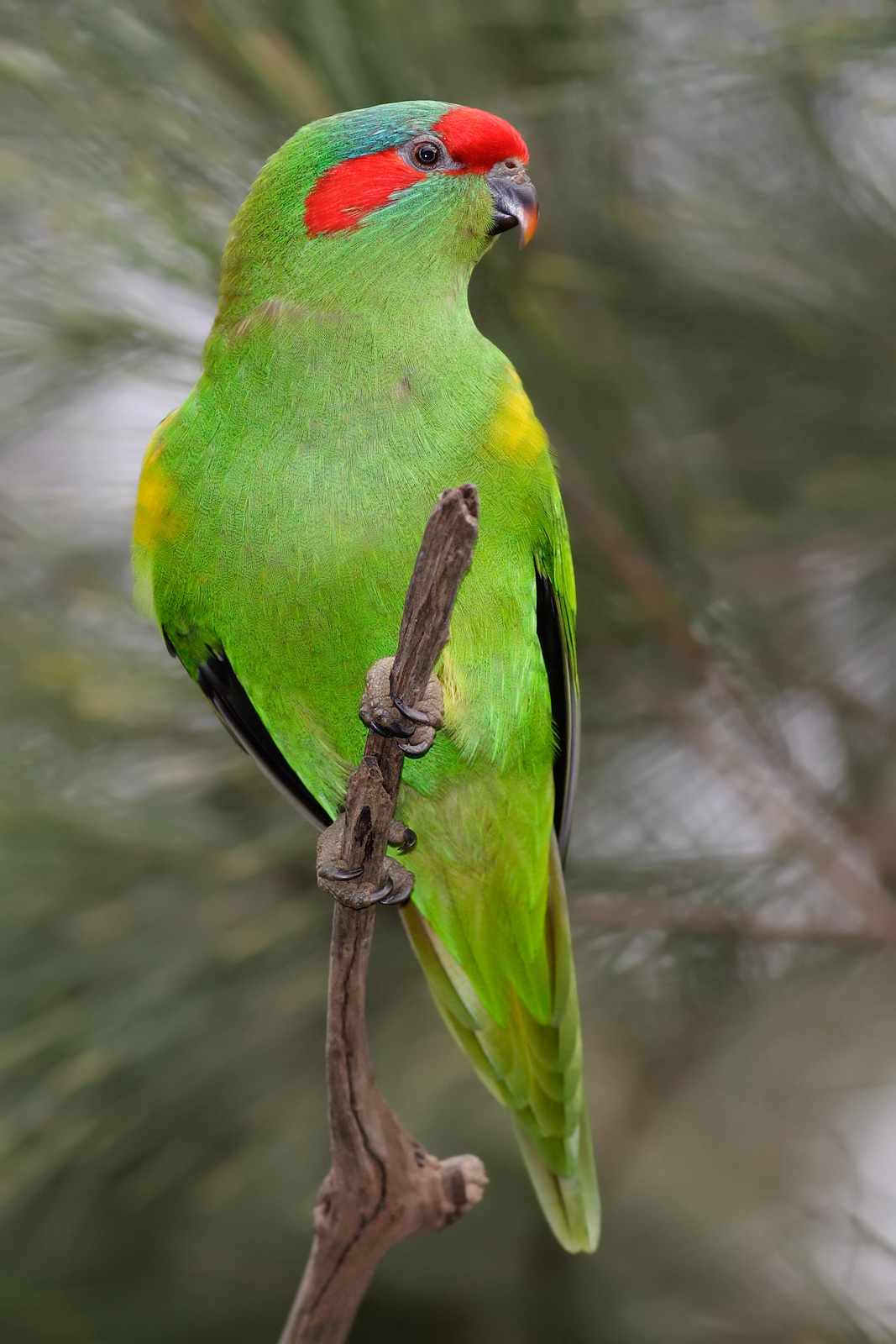
Glossopsitta concinna

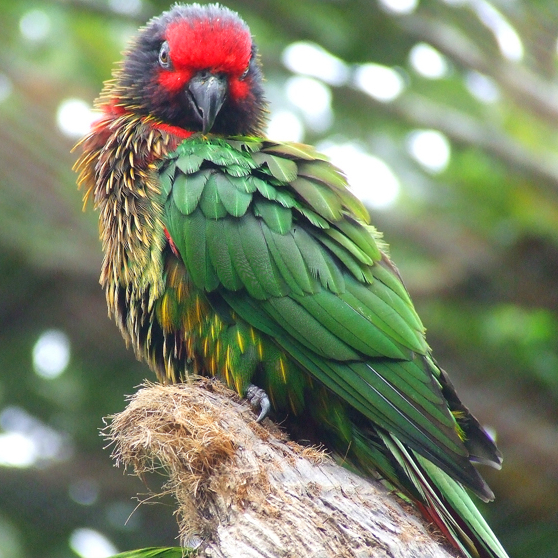
Chalcopsitta scintillata

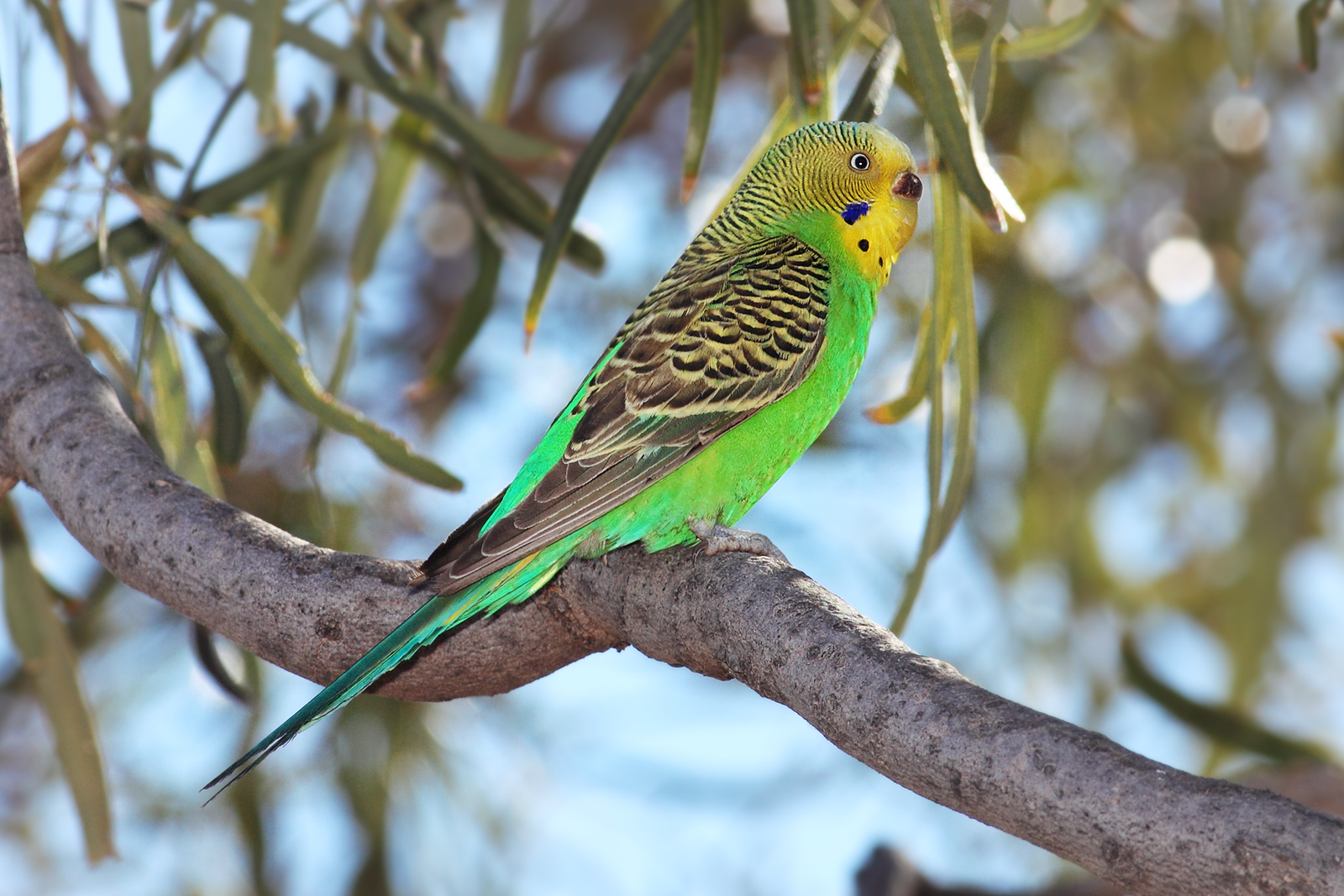
Melopsittacus undulatus

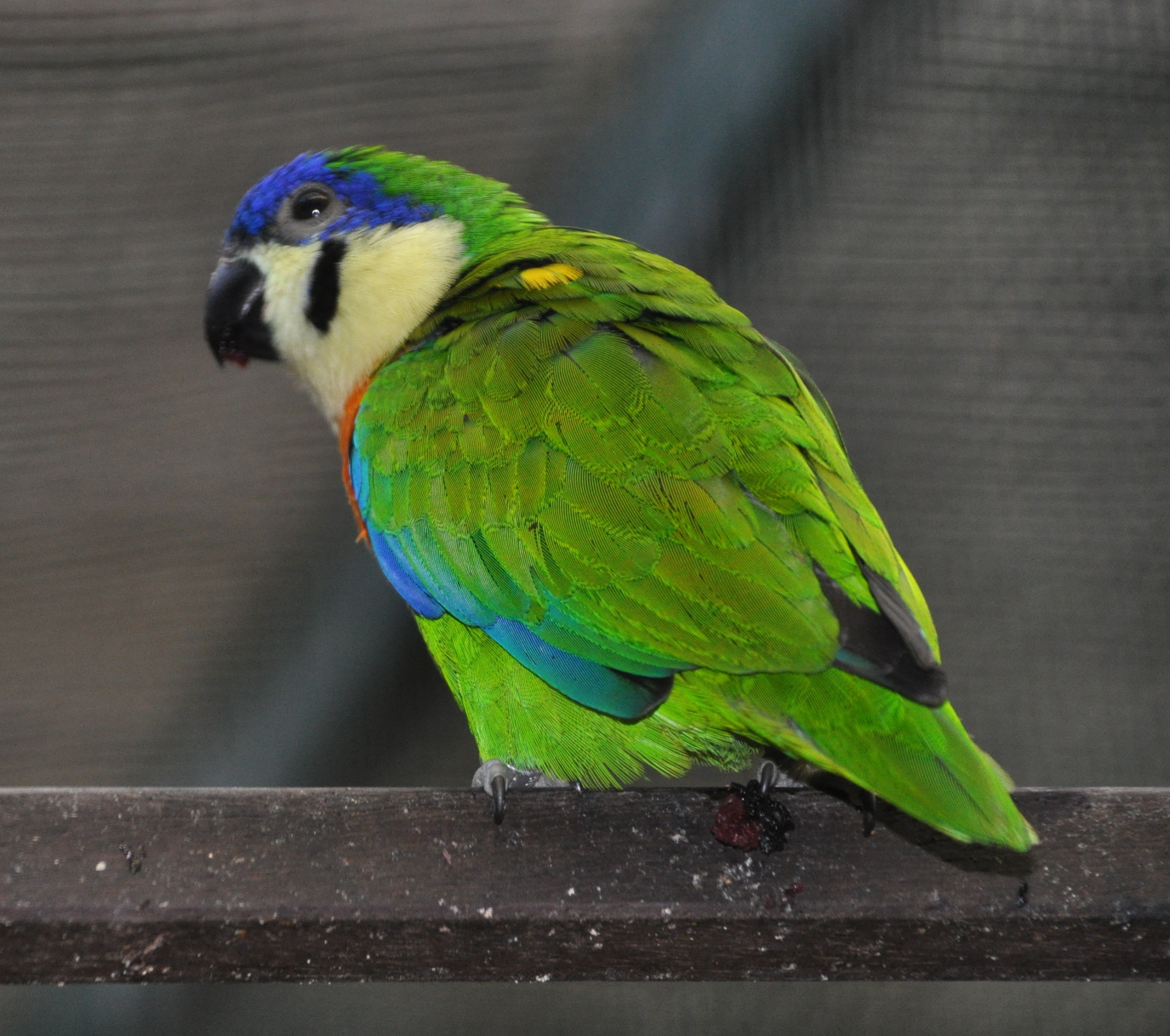
Cyclopsitta gulielmitertii

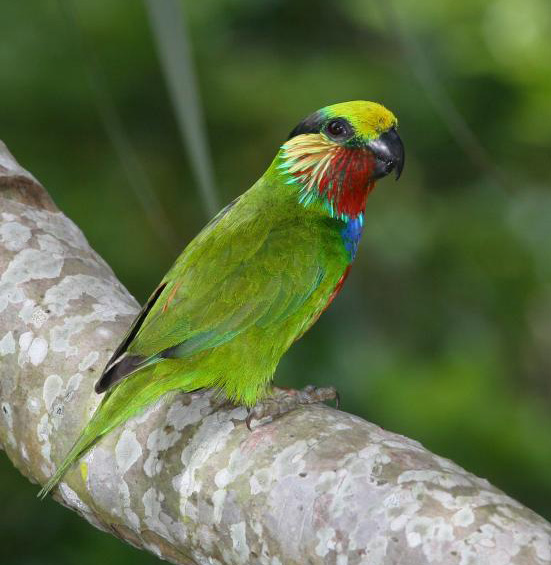
Psittaculirostris edwardsii

The subfamily includes the following genera and tribes:

Tribe Loriini:

- Genus Oreopsittacus
  - Plum-faced lorikeet, Oreopsittacus arfaki
- Genus Charminetta
  - Pygmy lorikeet, Charminetta wilhelminae
- Genus Hypocharmosyna
  - Red-fronted lorikeet, Hypocharmosyna rubronotata
  - Red-flanked lorikeet, Hypocharmosyna placentis
- Genus Charmosynopsis
  - Blue-fronted lorikeet, Charmosynopsis toxopei
  - Fairy lorikeet, Charmosynopsis pulchella
- Genus Synorhacma
  - Striated lorikeet, Synorhacma multistriata
- Genus Charmosyna
  - Josephine's lorikeet, Charmosyna josefinae
  - West Papuan lorikeet, Charmosyna papou
  - Stella's lorikeet, Charmosyna stellae
- Genus Charmosynoides
  - Duchess lorikeet, Charmosynoides margarethae
- Genus Vini
  - Meek's lorikeet, Vini meeki
  - Red-chinned lorikeet, Vini rubrigularis
  - Palm lorikeet, Vini palmarum
  - Red-throated lorikeet, Vini amabilis
  - New Caledonian lorikeet, Vini diadema (possibly extinct)
  - Collared lory, Vini solitaria
  - Blue-crowned lorikeet, Vini australis
  - Ultramarine lorikeet, Vini ultramarina
  - Stephen's lorikeet, Vini stepheni
  - Kuhl's lorikeet, Vini kuhlii
  - Blue lorikeet, Vini peruviana
- Genus Neopsittacus
  - Yellow-billed lorikeet, Neopsittacus musschenbroekii
  - Orange-billed lorikeet, Neopsittacus pullicauda
- Genus Lorius
  - White-naped lory, Lorius albidinucha
  - Yellow-bibbed lory, Lorius chlorocercus
  - Purple-naped lory, Lorius domicella
  - Chattering lory, Lorius garrulus
  - Purple-bellied lory, Lorius hypoinochrous
  - Black-capped lory, Lorius lory
- Genus Psitteuteles
  - Varied lorikeet, Psitteuteles versicolor
- Genus Parvipsitta
  - Purple-crowned lorikeet, Parvipsitta porphyrocephala
  - Little lorikeet, Parvipsitta pusilla
- Genus Pseudeos
  - Dusky lory, Pseudeos fuscata
  - Cardinal lory, Pseudeos cardinalis
- Genus Chalcopsitta
  - Brown lory, Chalcopsitta duivenbodei
  - Black lory, Chalcopsitta atra
  - Yellow-streaked lory, Chalcopsitta scintillata
- Genus Glossoptilus
  - Goldie's lorikeet, Glossoptilus goldiei
- Genus Glossopsitta
  - Musk lorikeet, Glossopsitta concinna
- Genus Saudareos
  - Mindanao lorikeet, Saudareos johnstoniae
  - Iris lorikeet, Saudareos iris
  - Sula lorikeet, Saudareos flavoviridis
  - Yellow-cheeked lorikeet, Saudareos meyeri
  - Ornate lorikeet, Saudareos ornata
- Genus Eos
  - Blue-streaked lory, Eos reticulata
  - Blue-eared lory, Eos semilarvata
  - Red lory, Eos bornea
  - Black-winged lory, Eos cyanogenia
  - Red-and-blue lory, Eos histrio
  - Violet-necked lory, Eos squamata
- Genus Trichoglossus
  - Pohnpei lorikeet, Trichoglossus rubiginosus
  - Scaly-breasted lorikeet, Trichoglossus chlorolepidotus
  - Coconut lorikeet, Trichoglossus haematodus
  - Biak lorikeet, Trichoglossus rosenbergii
  - Rainbow lorikeet, Trichoglossus moluccanus
  - Red-collared lorikeet, Trichoglossus rubritorquis
  - Olive-headed lorikeet, Trichoglossus euteles
  - Marigold lorikeet, Trichoglossus capistratus
  - Leaf lorikeet, Trichoglossus weberi
  - Sunset lorikeet, Trichoglossus forsteni

Tribe Melopsittacini:

- Genus Melopsittacus
  - Budgerigar, Melopsittacus undulatus (also called common parakeet or shell parakeet)

Tribe Cyclopsittini:

- Genus Cyclopsitta
  - Orange-breasted fig parrot, Cyclopsitta gulielmitertii
  - Double-eyed fig parrot, Cyclopsitta diophthalma
- Genus Psittaculirostris
  - Large fig parrot, Psittaculirostris desmarestii
  - Edwards's fig parrot, Psittaculirostris edwardsii
  - Salvadori's fig parrot, Psittaculirostris salvadorii
