= Tokyo Mew Mew =

Japanese manga series and its franchise

- The first volume of Tokyo Mew Mew published in Japan by Kodansha on February 6, 2001, featuring Ichigo Momomiya in her Mew Mew form

東京ミュウミュウ (Tōkyō Myū Myū)
- Genre: Magical girl
- Created by: Mia Ikumi
- Manga
- Written by: Reiko Yoshida
- Illustrated by: Mia Ikumi
- Published by: Kodansha
- English publisher: NA: Kodansha Comics; SG: Chuang Yi
- Imprint: Kodansha Comics
- Magazine: Nakayoshi
- Original run: September 2000 – February 2003
- Volumes: 7
- Anime television series
- Directed by: Noriyuki Abe
- Produced by: Akifumi Takayanagi; Hideyuki Kachi; Ken Hagino; Noboru Yamada
- Written by: Masashi Sogo
- Music by: Takayuki Negishi
- Studio: Pierrot
- Licensed by: NA: 4Kids Entertainment
- Original network: TXN (TV Aichi)
- English network: AU: Network Ten, Nickelodeon; CA: YTV; PH: TV5; UK: Pop Girl; US: Fox (4Kids TV); ZA: M-Net
- Original run: April 6, 2002 – March 29, 2003
- Episodes: 52
- Video game

Hamepane Tokyo Mew Mew
- Developer: Winkysoft
- Publisher: Takara
- Genre: Puzzle game
- Platform: Game Boy Advance
- Released: July 11, 2002
- Video game

Tokyo Mew Mew – Tōjō Shin Mew Mew! – Minna Issho ni Gohōshi Suru Nyan
- Developer: Winkysoft
- Publisher: Takara
- Genre: Role-playing video game
- Platform: PlayStation
- Released: December 5, 2001
- Manga

Tokyo Mew Mew à la Mode
- Written by: Mia Ikumi
- Published by: Kodansha
- English publisher: NA: Tokyopop
- Magazine: Nakayoshi
- Original run: April 2003 – February 2004
- Volumes: 2
- Manga

Tokyo Mew Mew Olé!
- Written by: Madoka Seizuki
- Published by: Kodansha
- Magazine: Nakayoshi
- Original run: December 2019 – August 2022
- Volumes: 7
- Anime television series

Tokyo Mew Mew New
- Directed by: Takahiro Natori
- Written by: Yuka Yamada
- Music by: Yasuharu Takanashi
- Studio: Yumeta Company; Graphinica
- Licensed by: Sentai Filmworks
- Original network: TV Tokyo, BS TV Tokyo, AT-X
- Original run: July 6, 2022 – June 21, 2023
- Episodes: 24
- icon

Tokyo Mew Mew (Japanese: 東京ミュウミュウ, Hepburn: Tōkyō Myū Myū) is a Japanese manga series created and illustrated by Mia Ikumi and written by Reiko Yoshida. It was originally serialized in Kodansha's shōjo manga magazine Nakayoshi from September 2000 to February 2003, with its chapters collected in seven tankōbon volumes by Kodansha. It focuses on five girls infused with the DNA of endangered animals which gives them special powers and allows them to transform into "Mew Mews". Led by Ichigo Momomiya, the girls protect Earth from aliens who wish to "reclaim" it.

The series was adapted into a fifty-two episode anime series produced by TV Aichi, We've Inc. & Tokyu Agency and animated by Pierrot. The anime aired in Japan from April 6, 2002, to March 29, 2003 on TXN affiliates. A two-volume sequel to the manga, Tokyo Mew Mew à la Mode, was serialized in Nakayoshi from April 2003 to February 2004. The sequel introduces a new character, Berry Shirayuki, who becomes the temporary leader of the Mew Mews. The series would inspire two video games: a puzzle adventure game for Game Boy Advance and a role-playing video game for the PlayStation.

Tokyopop originally licensed Tokyo Mew Mew for English-language publication in North America, and would release both the original series and à la Mode. Kodansha Comics would publish a newly translated version of the manga in September 2011. 4Kids Entertainment licensed the anime series for North American broadcast under the title Mew Mew Power, and produced an edited English-language localization. The first twenty-three episodes of the series would air on 4Kids TV in the United States, with three additional episodes airing on YTV in Canada. 4Kids was unable to license the remaining 26 episodes of the series or release the series on home video.

Tokyo Mew Mew was well received by English-language readers, with critics praising the manga for being a "cute and entertaining" series with "free-flowing style and character designs". Several volumes of the manga series appeared in the Top 50 sales lists for graphic novels in their respective months of release. The anime series received high ratings in Japan, while Mew Mew Power would become 4Kids' highest-rated show during its American broadcast, and be licensed for regional release in several other countries.

In 2020, a second, two-chapter sequel called Tokyo Mew Mew 2020 Re-Turn was released, featuring the main characters with updated designs; and as well as a spinoff, titled Tokyo Mew Mew Olé!, which features a new team of male Mew Mews. In addition, a new anime adaptation of the series, Tokyo Mew Mew New, was announced; the series aired from July to September 2022. A second season premiered in April 2023.

== Plot ==
In Tokyo, Japan, a young girl named Ichigo Momomiya attends an endangered species exhibit with her crush Masaya Aoyama. After an earthquake, Ichigo and four other girls are bathed in a strange light. A cat appears before Ichigo, then merges with her. The next day, she begins acting like a cat and making cat puns. After meeting Ryou Shirogane and Keiichirou Akasaka, Ichigo learns that she was infused with the DNA of the Iriomote cat. Ryou and Keiichirou explain that this allows her to transform into Mew Ichigo, a powerful heroic cat girl. She is ordered to defeat Chimera Animas—alien parasites which infect animals and turn them into monsters. Ryou and Keiichirou instruct Ichigo to find the four other girls from the exhibit—the remaining Mew Mews.

The first Mew Mew Ichigo encounters are Minto Aizawa, a spoiled, wealthy girl and ballerina who is infused with the genes of the blue lorikeet; (Note: Tokyopop translated Minto's fused species as the ultramarine lorikeet; however, in Mew Mew Power, Kodansha USA volumes and the Finnish adaptation of the series it is stated to be the blue lorikeet, a distinct species. In Japanese materials for the series, the kana is ノドジロルリインコ, which is the kana name of the blue lorikeet, versus コンセイインコ, which would be the ultramarine lorikeet.) Retasu Midorikawa, a shy but smart girl who endures constant bullying from three girls and absorbs the genes of the finless porpoise; a hyper and yet young girl named Bu-Ling Huang who receives the genes of the golden lion tamarin; and Zakuro Fujiwara, a professional actress and model infused with the genes of the gray wolf.

The five Mew Mews battle the Chimera Animas and their alien controllers Quiche, Pie and Tart. Quiche falls in love with Ichigo where he tries to gain her love despite the fact that he is trying to eliminate the other Mew Mews. Pie and Tart later join Quiche in trying to destroy the Mew Mews.

As the fighting intensifies, the Mew Mews are tasked with finding "Mew Aqua", a material created from pure water that contains immense power for combating the alien attacks and can be sensed by the Mew Mews. During a battle with Quiche at an aquarium, Ichigo is in danger of losing when the mysterious Blue Knight appears and rescues her. He returns periodically throughout the series, protecting Ichigo from various dangers. It is later revealed that the Blue Knight is in fact Masaya. Shortly after this discovery, Masaya collapses and transforms again. This time, he transforms into Deep Blue, the alien leader who wants to destroy humanity. After explaining to Ichigo that Masaya was a false form for temporary use, Deep Blue attacks the Mew Mews. Pie and Tart try to stop the other mew mews while Ichigo goes after Deep Blue. He and Quiche battle and Deep Blue wins.

Masaya's personality briefly reappears and he uses the Mew Aqua inside Deep Blue to save Ichigo and Tokyo, killing himself in the process. Devastated over his loss, Ichigo pours her power into Masaya to save his life, losing her own in the process. Masaya kisses her, changing her back to a human and revives her. Ryou gives Pie the remaining Mew Aqua to save the aliens' world, after which Quiche, Pie, and Tart say their goodbyes and return to their own world.

=== Sequels and Spin-offs ===
==== Tokyo Mew Mew à La Mode ====
Ichigo and Masaya move to England to study endangered species. The remaining Mew Mews continue to eliminate the Chimera Animas left behind by the aliens. They face a new threat in the form of the Saint Rose Crusaders: Humans with supernatural abilities who desire to conquer the world and create a "utopia" while taking over the remaining Chimera Animas.

Berry Shirayuki becomes the sixth Mew Mew and temporarily takes Ichigo's place as the leader. Berry is the first Mew Mew to be infused with the DNA of two endangered species, the Andean mountain cat and the Amami rabbit. As one of the strongest Mew Mews, Berry is targeted by two of the Crusaders, who attack her at school. Ichigo returns to provide assistance during this battle. For their final attack, two Crusaders hypnotize the citizens of Tokyo and set them against the Mew Mews. Berry and her childhood friend Tasuku Meguro use their newfound feelings of love to reverse the hypnosis and cause a change of heart in the Crusaders.

==== Tokyo Mew Mew Olé! ====
This spin-off follows five high school boys, Aoi Shibuya, Shizuka Yoyogi, Ryusei Kanda, Taichi Hiroo, and Ayato Roppongi, as they protect Tokyo by transforming into Mew Mews alongside female lead, Anzu Hinata.

== Production ==
Mia Ikumi spent a year designing the Tokyo Mew Mew manga before the release of the first volume in February 2001. The story she originally presented to her editors, Tokyo Black Cat Girl, featured a heroine named Hime Azumi. An intergalactic police officer named Masha gave her the ability to transform into a cat-girl and asked her to aid him in defeating alien invaders called the Bugs. After the production team decided to focus on five female superheroes, Ikumi was asked to reconstruct the lead character. She had reservations about the changes, as the character was originally designed for a more dramatic series.

As Tokyo Mew Mew became a viable project, Kodansha hired Reiko Yoshida to be the series' scenario writer and story supervisor. Yoshida and two other editors determined each volume's plot, created a scenario by adding stage directions and dialogue, and presented it to Ikumi. Ikumi added her own ideas and changes, creating the manuscript's first draft, which was taken to the publishers for final review and approval. This differs from most manga series, in which the manga writer also creates the scenarios and stories before submitting to their editor for approval.

After the first volume's release, a two-day Tokyo Mew Mew festival was held during the Golden Week holiday—a week-long span in late April and early May during which four public holidays occur—to promote the series. Events included a Tokyo Mew Mew art gallery and the release of new merchandise. Ikumi, the series' artist, created a special poster for the event, featuring all twelve characters. She also cosplayed as characters from the series, as Minto Aizawa on one day and Retasu Midorikawa on the other.

== Media ==
=== Manga ===
Written by Reiko Yoshida and illustrated by Mia Ikumi, Tokyo Mew Mew was first serialized in Nakayoshi magazine between September 2000 and February 2003. The twenty-nine chapters were then compiled into seven tankōbon volumes by Kodansha. The first volume was released on February 1, 2001, with the final volume released April 4, 2003. In April 2003, a sequel called Tokyo Mew Mew à la Mode premiered in Nakayoshi. Running until February 2004 and written solely by Mia Ikumi, the sequel was published as two volumes. In December 2019, an additional spinoff called Tokyo Mew Mew Olé! made by Madoka Seizuki began running in Nakayoshi. The spinoff focuses on a new team of male Mew Mews. The manga ended in August 2022, and was compiled into seven volumes. A short, 2-chapter manga sequel of the original series made by the original creators titled Tokyo Mew Mew 2020 Re-Turn was published between December 2019 and January 2020. It was Ikumi's final manga before her death in March 2022.

Tokyo Mew Mew and Tokyo Mew Mew à la Mode are licensed for an English-language release in North America by Tokyopop. The first volume of the main series was released on June 1, 2004, with volumes released subsequently until the seventh volume was published on December 15, 2005. The two volumes of Tokyo Mew Mew à la Mode were released on June 7 and September 13, 2005, respectively. Unlike the Japanese releases, each Tokyopop chapter is named. The main series is licensed for an English language release in Singapore by Chuang Yi. Carlsen Comics has licensed the series, through its regional divisions, and released the series in German, Danish and Swedish. The series is also licensed for regional language releases in French by Pika Édition, in Polish by Japonica Polonica Fantastica, and in Finnish by Sangatsu Manga. Tokyo Mew Mew was one of the first manga series released in Spanish in North America by Public Square Books. Kodansha Comics released an omnibus version of the series, featuring a new translation in September 2011.

=== Anime ===
Pierrot, TV Aichi, Tokyu Agency and We've Inc. adapted Tokyo Mew Mew into a fifty-two episode anime series, directed by Noriyuki Abe. Broadcast on TXN affiliates, the series premiered on April 6, 2002, and aired weekly until its conclusion on March 29, 2003. Most of the music for the series was produced by Shin Yoshimura and composed by Takayuki Negishi. Two pieces of theme music were also used for the anime series. "My Sweet Heart", performed by Rika Komatsu, was the series opening theme. The ending theme "Koi wa A La Mode" is performed by the five voice actors who play the Mew Mews. In Japan, the series was released across nine Region 2 DVD volumes. The ninth volume included a bonus DVD containing extra content. At some point during the TV broadcast, AEON changed its name to We've.

Tokyo Mew Mew was later licensed for an English-language dubbed release by 4Kids Entertainment. In its announcement about the series, 4Kids originally noted that the show would be renamed to Hollywood Mew Mew and that they would be heavily editing and localizing episodes so that viewers would not recognize its Japanese origins. Subsequent 4Kids press releases about the series referred to the new series as The Mew Mews and its original name Tokyo Mew Mew. When the series premiered on 4Kids TV on February 19, 2005, it aired under the name as Mew Mew Power. Characters and episodes were renamed, scenes were cut and storylines were modified. The music was replaced with a new score provided by Bear in the Big Blue House and The Book of Pooh composer, Julian Harris, and the opening theme was replaced with the song "Team Up", performed by Bree Sharp and Mollie Weaver. Only twenty-six episodes of Mew Mew Power aired on 4Kids TV in the United States because 4Kids was unable to get a merchandising deal for the series and the English dub had stopped production. The 4Kids episodes aired on YTV in Canada and on the Pop Girl satellite television channel in the United Kingdom; these included three dubbed episodes not broadcast in the United States.

Although Mew Mew Power has not been released to home video in North America, ten of the 4Kids episodes have been released to Region 4 DVD in Australia and New Zealand by Magna Pacific and all twenty-six 4Kids episodes were released to Region 2 DVD in South Africa. Mew Mew Power was licensed for regional airing in French by Arès Films, which released nine dubbed 4Kids episodes to DVD in February 2006 as a single volume through Warner Home Vidéo France. The French dub aired on Télétoon+ as part of their Code F block. The company also licensed the remaining twenty-six episodes of the series that 4Kids had not obtained, releasing them in two DVD box sets through AK Vidéo.

A new anime adaptation titled Tokyo Mew Mew New was announced to commemorate the manga's 20th anniversary. It was later revealed that the adaptation will be animated by Yumeta Company and Graphinica, and directed by Takahiro Natori, with Yuka Yamada handling the series' scripts, Satoshi Ishino designing the characters, and Yasuharu Takanashi composing the music. New cast members were chosen to play the Mew Mews through a public audition held in Q2 2020, and they will also be promoting as an idol group named Smewthie as their characters. The new series premiered on July 6, 2022, on TV Tokyo. Sentai Filmworks has licensed the series outside of Asia and was streamed on Hidive.

A second season of Tokyo Mew Mew New was announced at the end of the final episode on September 21, 2022. It premiered in April 2023.

=== Video games ===
The cover of the second Tokyo Mew Mew video game that was released in Japan on December 5, 2002. It has the original Mew Mews standing behind new character, Mew Ringo, who was designed by Mia Ikumi specifically for the game.

Two video games based on the Tokyo Mew Mew series were launched in 2002 by Takara. The first, Hamepane Tokyo Mew Mew (はめパネ 東京ミュウミュウ, Hamepane Tōkyō Myū Myū), a puzzle adventure game for the Game Boy Advance, was released in Japan on July 11, 2002.

The second title, Tōkyō Mew Mew – Enter the New Mew Mew! – Serve Everyone Together (東京ミュウミュウ 登場 新ミュウミュウ！みんないっしょにご奉仕するにゃん, Tōkyō Myū Myū – Tōjō Shin Myū Myū! Minna Issho ni Gohōshi suru Nyan), was released in Japan on December 5, 2002. It is a PlayStation turn-based role-playing video game in which the player controls a new Mew Mew, Ringo Akai (赤井 りんご, Akai Ringo), as well as the original five heroines. They must defend Ringo's island from Quiche, the Chimera Animas and a new alien named Gateau du Roi (ガトー·デュ·ロワ, Gatō dyu Rowa). Both Ringo Akai and Gateau were created by the manga's artist, Mia Ikumi, following design specifications from Takara. The game uses voice actors from the anime series, with the two new characters voiced by Taeko Kawata and Ryōtarō Okiayu, respectively. Ikumi was pleased with how both characters turned out and expressed a desire to use Ringo as a regular character in a future manga series. Ringo later joined the other Mew Mews in the Petite Mew Mew bonus story in the second volume of Tokyo Mew Mew à la Mode.

=== CDs ===
Multiple music and character CDs have been released for the Tokyo Mew Mew series by King Records. The first, a CD single, contained the full and karaoke versions of "Koi wa A La Mode", performed by the five voice actors who played the Mew Mews, and a second song performed by Saki Nakajima, who voices Ichigo.

On July 24, 2002, a five-disc limited edition collector's box set was released containing character songs for each of the Mew Mews, performed by their respective voice actors and a remix of "Koi wa A La Mode". The individual character song discs were released as standalone CDs on September 4, 2002. An additional character CD set, containing remixed versions of two songs from each individual album, followed on December 25, 2002. A second character CD for Ichigo, containing five new tracks performed by Nakajima, was released on February 26, 2003.

The first full anime soundtrack, Tokyo Mew Mew Original Soundtrack was released on September 25, 2002, by NEC. The CD included the series opening and ending themes and twenty-seven pieces of series background music. NEC released a second soundtrack on January 22, 2003; it contains the opening and closing themes, along with an additional twenty-nine tracks of background music. On March 26, 2003, two "best of" CDs were released for the anime series: Tokyo Mew Mew Super Best Hit – Cafe Mew Mew side and Tokyo Mew Mew Super Best Hit – Tokyo Mew Mew side. Each CD includes ten of the series' "most popular" musical pieces.

== Reception ==
The Tokyo Mew Mew manga series was well received by English-speaking audiences. In March and April 2003, the first volume sold an estimated 1,597 and 1,746 copies respectively. This put the volume at the low end of the top 50 sales for each month. By 2004, with most of the series released, it became a mild success for licensor Tokyopop. It was ranked 16th on the list of Manga Top 50 for the first quarter of 2004 in the ICv2 Retailers Guide to Anime/Manga, based on sales from both mainstream bookstores and comic book shops. Sales of the sixth and seventh volumes dropped slightly; however, both were among the top 100 best-selling graphic novels in March and May 2004. The first volume of Tokyo Mew Mew à la Mode debuted 63rd on the list of top 100 best-selling graphic novels of May 2005, with nearly double the sales figures of the last volume of the main series. On the Nielsen Bookscan charts, the volume debuted at rank 39 before quickly climbing to the 14th spot. The second volume of à la Mode saw similar success, debuting in the 69th slot before advancing to the 12th position, a result of the Mew Mew Power show appearing on 4Kids TV.

Tokyo Mew Mew was generally well received by reviewers, who described it as cute and entertaining. Though AnimeFringe's Patrick King notes that it is not a very intellectual series and that it avoids complex plot points, he lauded it as engrossing "brain candy" and an "endearing action-romance" that has no "delusions of grandeur". Critics praised the artwork in both Tokyo Mew Mew and the sequel Tokyo Mew Mew à La Mode. Ikumi's "free flowing" style and character designs were seen as a perfect fit for the series. Criticism of Ikumi's art focused on images which regularly spilled out of panel borders and speech bubbles with ambiguous speakers. Patrick King of Animefringe stated: "one of the most attractive aspects of Tokyo Mew Mew is easily Mia Ikumi's ultra-cute artwork. Big eyes, cat ears, fuzzy tails, and short skirts all come together in a cuteness combo that's hard to resist." According to Carlo Santos of Anime News Network, "Mia Ikumi's artwork is perfectly suited to the story, and it is not even all that wispy and frilly compared to other shōjo material. Like many budding manga artist, Ikumi's greatest strength is in carefully posed character portraits, and her prolific use of tones creates unique effects while also sidestepping the challenge of backgrounds."

Over all Tokyo Mew Mew à La Mode had more mixed reviews. Critics praised it for being a modern manga that typifies the magical girl formula, highlighting both its strengths and weaknesses. Mike Dungan, of Mania Entertainment, considered the original series to be "quite charming" and felt that à la Mode was a good continuation of the series with the "same fun and excitement" as its predecessor. Others felt Berry was an overly shallow heroine and that the sequel offered nothing new for readers with the Saint Rose Crusaders' costumes and plans being nothing more than concepts borrowed from Sailor Moon. Janet Crocker, Shannon Fay and Chris Istel of Animefringe criticized à la Mode for having the character Duke, the main villain of the arc, dressed in a white robe similar to those used by the white supremacy group, the Ku Klux Klan. Garrity felt à La Mode was a vehicle for referencing Tokyo Mew Mew fandom and merchandise and that Berry was a "transparent wish-fulfillment protagonist".

The anime adaptation has been compared to Sailor Moon and Yes! PreCure 5 due to both having female protagonists, five original team members with signature colors and powers, and similar plot lines, as have many magical girl series. Tokyo Mew Mew received high ratings in Japan with extensive merchandizing tie ins and marketing events to promote the series. The announcement of 4Kids licensing the anime series drew negative reactions from English-speaking in the U.S. fans, due to 4Kids' practice of removing cultural elements from their English-dubbed adaptations. Several fans would campaign to have the company to release an uncut version of the anime series. Overall viewer reception to Mew Mew Power would be mixed, but the show would become the block's highest-rated program at the start of the Fall 2005 season. Despite this, the series was never released to DVD in North America. Mew Mew Power would be licensed for broadcast in France, Latin America, Australia, New Zealand, Portugal, Brazil, Albania, Serbia, Croatia, Turkey, Greece, South Africa, Denmark, the Netherlands, Bulgaria and Israel.

== Notes ==
Preceded by Gyōten Ningen Batseelor (4/7/2001 – 3/30/2002)	TV Aichi Saturday 8:00 Timeframe; Tokyo Mew Mew (April 6, 2002 – March 29, 2003)	Succeeded by Mermaid Melody Pichi Pichi Pitch (4/5/2003 – 3/27/2004)
