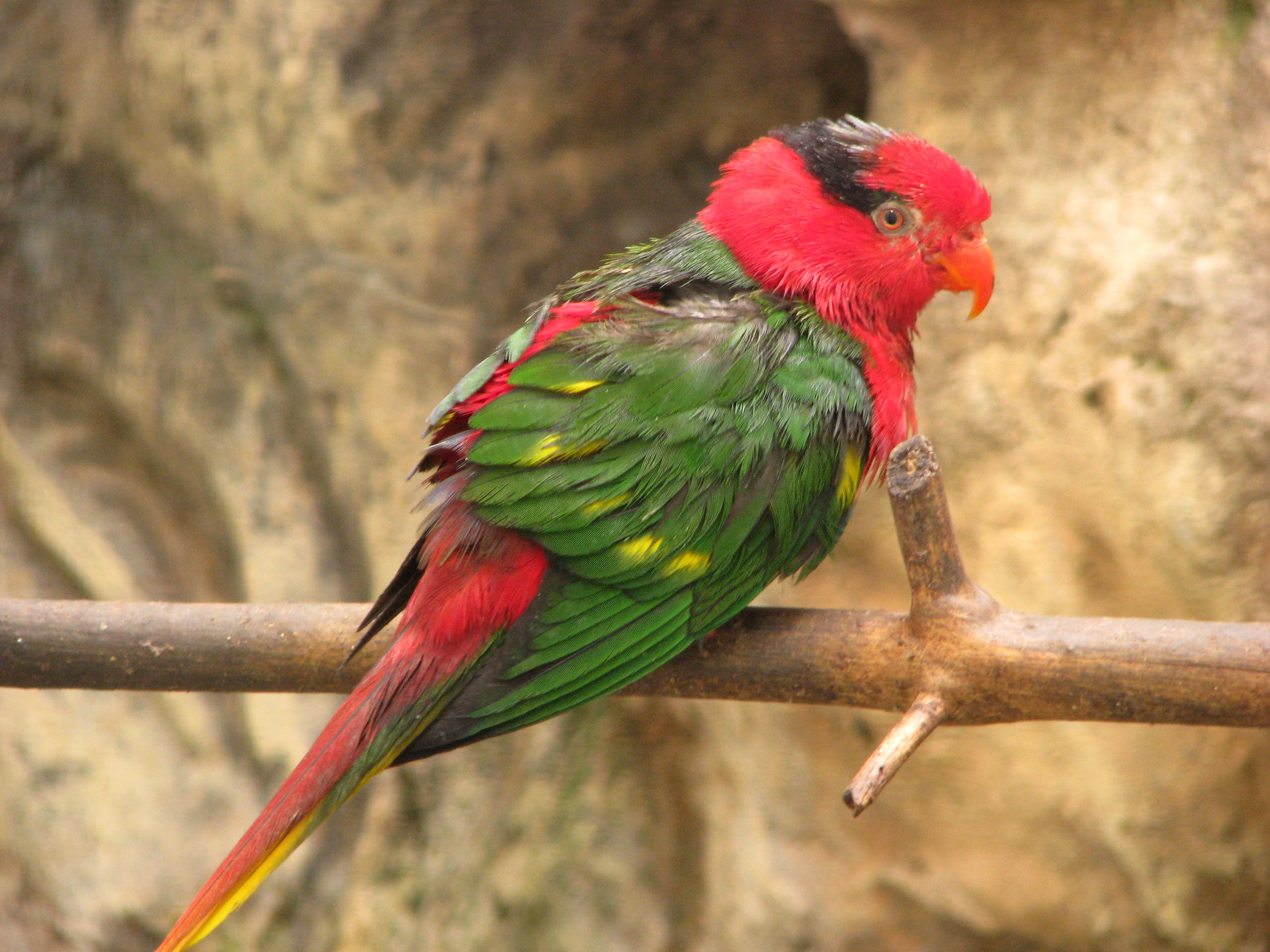
- Josephine's lorikeet (Charmosyna josefinae)

Scientific classification
- Kingdom: Animalia
- Phylum: Chordata
- Class: Aves
- Order: Psittaciformes
- Family: Psittaculidae
- Subfamily: Loriinae
- Genus: Charmosyna; Wagler, 1832

Type species
- Psittacus papuensis Gmelin, 1788

= Charmosyna =

Genus of birds

Charmosyna is a genus of parrots in the family Psittaculidae. The four currently recognized species inhabit moist forests on the island of New Guinea.

== Taxonomy ==
Charmosyna contains the following four species:

Image	Common name	Scientific name	Distribution
	Striated lorikeet	Charmosyna multistriata	mountains of western New Guinea (Snow Mountains to Chimbu Province)
	Josephine's lorikeet	Charmosyna josefinae	montane New Guinea (except southeast)
	West Papuan lorikeet	Charmosyna papou	western New Guinea (montane forest of Bird's Head Peninsula)
	Stella's lorikeet	Charmosyna stellae	montane central west to northeast (Adelbert Range and Huon Peninsula) and southeast New Guinea

The genus formerly included twelve additional species: pygmy lorikeet (Charminetta wilhelminae), red-fronted lorikeet (Hypocharmosyna rubronotata), red-flanked lorikeet (Hypocharmosyna placentis), blue-fronted lorikeet (Charmosynopsis toxopei), fairy lorikeet (Charmosynopsis pulchella), striated lorikeet (Synorhacma multistriata), duchess lorikeet (Charmosynoides margarethae), Meek's lorikeet (Vini meeki), red-chinned lorikeet (Vini rubrigularis), palm lorikeet (Vini palmarum), red-throated lorikeet (Vini amabilis), and New Caledonian lorikeet (Vini diadema). These were moved to other genera based on the results of a molecular phylogenetic study of the lorikeets published in 2020.
