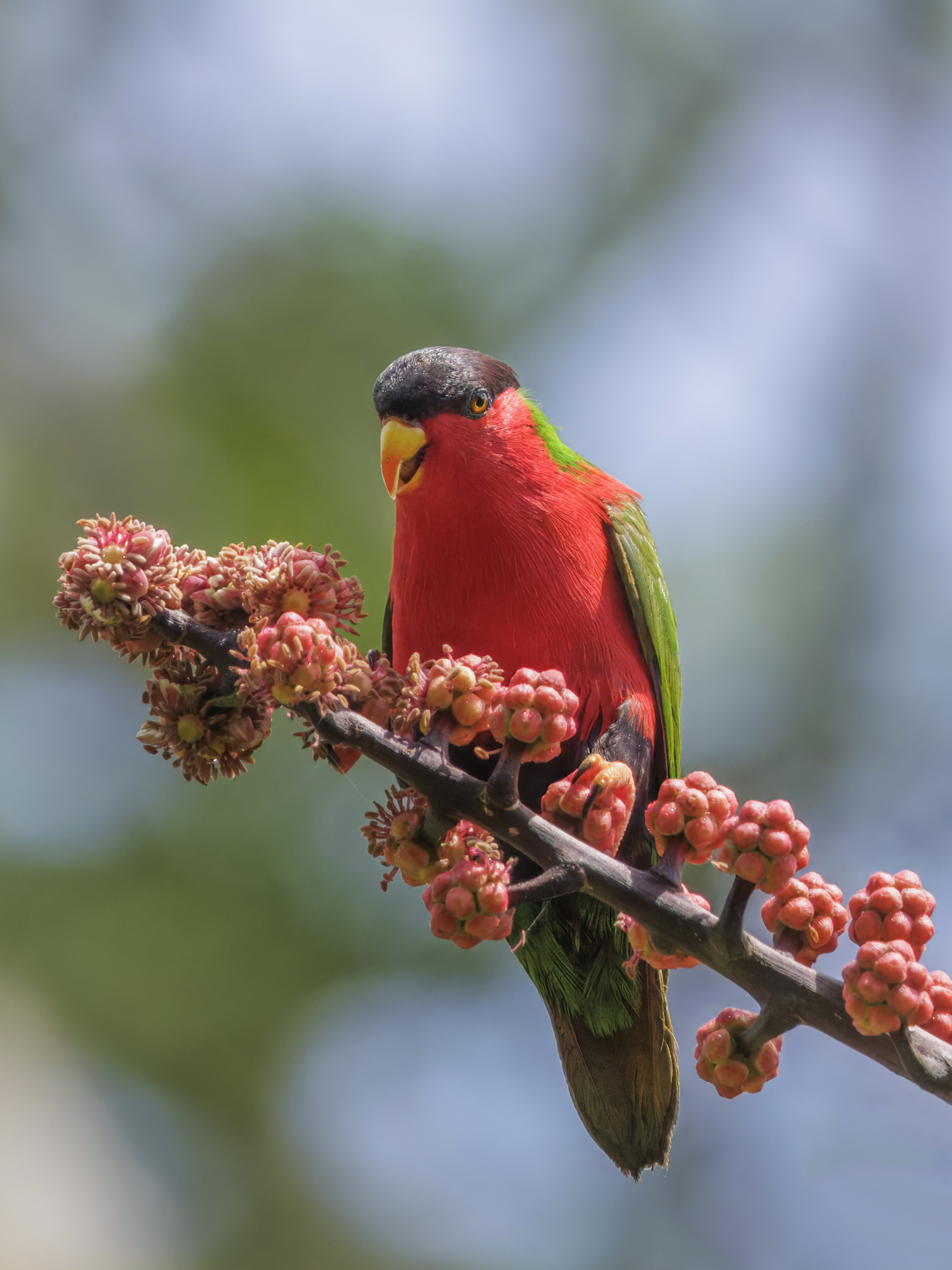
- Collared lory (Vini solitaria)

Scientific classification
- Kingdom: Animalia
- Phylum: Chordata
- Class: Aves
- Order: Psittaciformes
- Family: Psittaculidae
- Tribe: Loriini
- Genus: Vini; Lesson, RP, 1833

Type species
- Vini coccinea Lesson, 1833

= Vini (bird) =

Genus of birds

Vini is a genus of birds in the family Psittaculidae that are endemic to the islands of the tropical Pacific. There are eleven extant species of these small lorikeets ranging from the Bismark Archipelago through Fiji, Samoa, French Polynesia, and as far east as Henderson Island. All members of the genus have exceptional bright plumage, particularly the unusual all over blues of the blue lorikeet and the ultramarine lorikeet.

The Vini lorikeets are highly threatened by human changes to their islands. Most species have been lost from a number of islands and two species became extinct before the arrival of European explorers in the Pacific. As of 2017, two species are listed as endangered species by the IUCN and two are considered vulnerable. They are primarily threatened by introduced species, such as rats, and habitat loss.

== Taxonomy ==
The genus Vini was introduced in 1833 by the French naturalist René Lesson for Kuhl's lorikeet. The genus name is the Tahitian word for a local bird.

This genus formerly included only the blue-crowned, ultramarine, Stephen's, Kuhl's, and blue lorikeets (as well as the extinct Sinoto's and conquered lorikeets); the collared lory was formerly placed in the monotypic genus Phigys, and the remaining five species were placed in Charmosyna. A molecular phylogenetic study of the lorikeets published in 2020 led to a revision of the generic boundaries.

=== Species ===
The genus contains 12 species:

Image	Common name	Scientific name	Distribution
	Duchess lorikeet	Vini margarethae	Solomon Islands Archipelago
	Red-throated lorikeet	Vini amabilis	Fiji
	Blue-crowned lorikeet	Vini australis	Futuna, Lau Islands, Niue, Samoan Islands and Tonga
	New Caledonian lorikeet	Vini diadema	New Caledonia
	Kuhl's lorikeet	Vini kuhlii	Austral Islands (Rimatara), Cook Islands (Atiu) and Kiribati (Line Islands)
	Meek's lorikeet	Vini meeki	Solomon Islands Archipelago
	Palm lorikeet	Vini palmarum	Santa Cruz Islands and Vanuatu
	Blue lorikeet	Vini peruviana	French Polynesia and the Cook Islands
	Red-chinned lorikeet	Vini rubrigularis	Bismarck Archipelago
	Stephen's lorikeet	Vini stepheni	Henderson Island in the Pitcairn Islands
	Collared lory	Vini solitaria	Fiji
	Ultramarine lorikeet	Vini ultramarina	Marquesas Islands

== Fossils ==
- †Sinoto's lorikeet, Vini sinotoi (extinct)
- †Conquered lorikeet, Vini vidivici (extinct)
