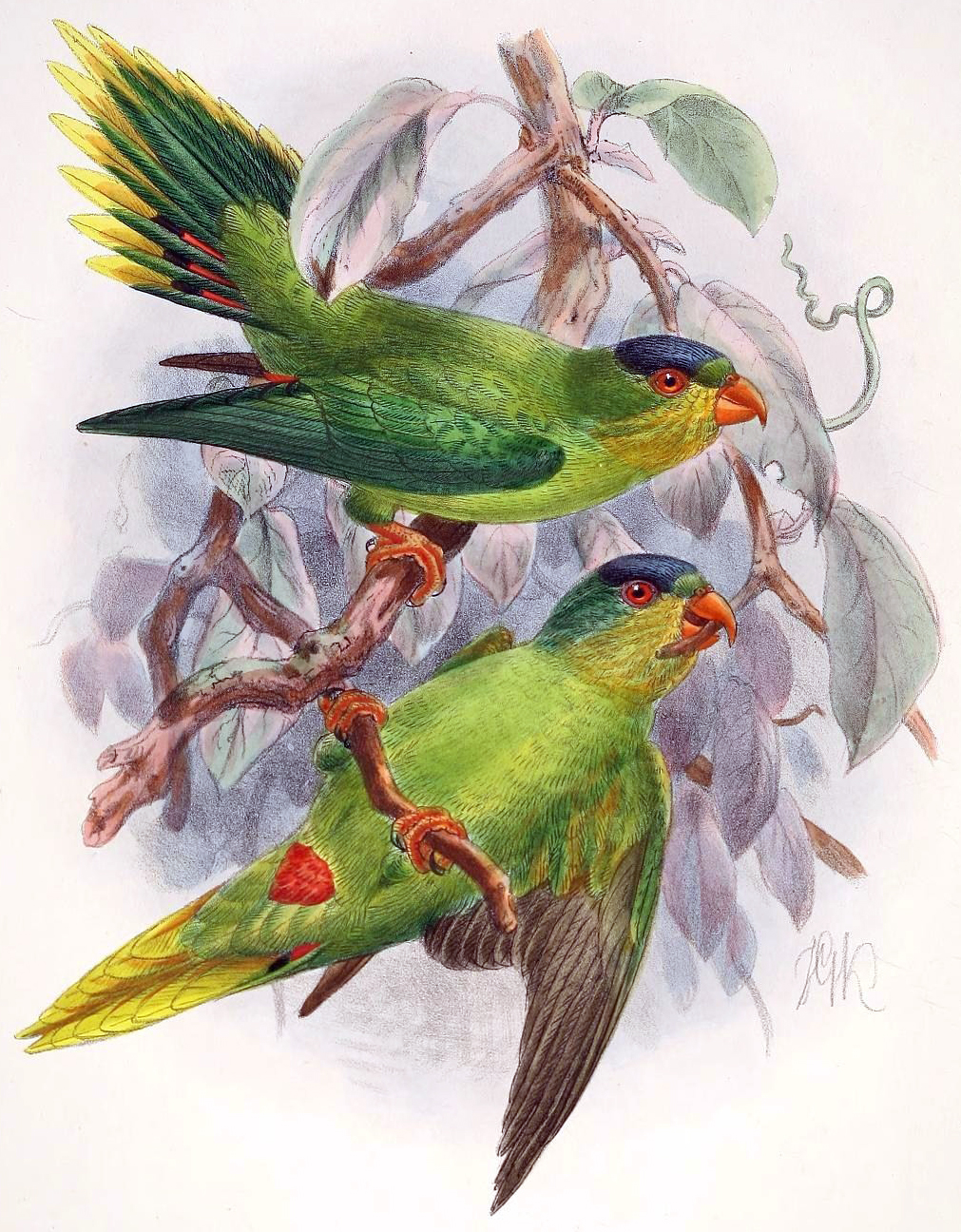

Conservation status
- Critically endangered, possibly extinct (IUCN 3.1)

Scientific classification
- Kingdom: Animalia
- Phylum: Chordata
- Class: Aves
- Order: Psittaciformes
- Family: Psittaculidae
- Genus: Vini
- Species: V. diadema

Binomial name
- Vini diadema (Verreaux & Des Murs, 1860)

Synonyms
- Psitteuteles diadema Verreaux & Des Murs, 1860; Charmosyna diadema

= New Caledonian lorikeet =

Species of bird

The New Caledonian lorikeet (Vini diadema) is a possibly extinct lorikeet endemic to the Melanesian island of New Caledonia.

== Taxonomy ==
The New Caledonian lorikeet was formerly assigned to the genus Charmosyna. It was moved to the genus Vini based on a molecular phylogenetic study of the lorikeets published in 2020; although this species was not sampled, it was transferred to the newly-expanded Vini based on consideration of plumage and biogeography.

== Description ==
The New Caledonian lorikeet is 18–19 cm (7.1–7.5 in) long, 7–8 cm (2.8–3.1 in) of which is the slim and pointed tail. The wings are slender and pointed, measuring 91 mm (3.6 in) in the only specimen. Its tarsus is 16 cm (6.3 in) long.

Female birds are green overall, with deep violet blue crown and dark bluish thighs, a yellowish face and underside face, and a red anal region. The tail is green above and yellowish olive below, with the four lateral feathers with red basal markings followed by a black band, tipped yellow on the underside. The beak is orange-red, the iris probably dark orange like the feet.

Males have not been recorded. Based on similar species, they likely have more red coloration, probably including the face, underside of the primaries and the rump sides; and are likely slightly larger. Immature birds should look like dull females.

Its noises are also unknown but—again based on similar species—are likely high-pitched screeches. These would be the most telling sign of the species, but only to observers familiar with other local parrots' vocalizations. While the birds would be unmistakable due to their small size, they are extremely hard to spot.

== Distribution ==
The provenance of the extant specimen is unknown. One was shot at Mont Ignambi near Oubatche in 1913, but not preserved. Unverified reports exist from west of Mont Panié and the Mont Ignambi area in the North Province, and from the La Foa-Canala road and Yaté Lake in the South Province. It might be in the area around Mont Panié and Mont Humboldt—about 60 km (37 mi) SE of Canala—and the Massif du Kouakoué. Given the low accessibility of the highlands, flocks could, in theory, exist in any of the larger remaining patches of relatively undisturbed forest, e.g., between the intercoastal roads around the province border.

== Ecology ==
This bird is hard to track because it is nomadic and is relatively inconspicuous. The species is believed to live in humid montane forests but flies in and out of lowland Melaleuca forests. Most reports come from such lowland forests, but this probably reflects better accessibility. Mt. Ignambi is believed to be an ideal habitat for the species. The Yaté Lake report was from an area of low shrubland.

The bird apparently keeps to treetops. Related species eat nectar, pollen, blossoms, and sometimes soft fruit, foraging in pairs or small (typically fewer than 10) flocks. Erythrina was specifically mentioned as food plants for this species. Reproduction data for 'green' Charmosyna lorikeets is only available for the Red-flanked (C. placentis) and the red-fronted lorikeet (C. rubronotata). Breeding season probably is July–December, and possibly to February, or even all-year round. They excavate in arboreal termite nests or epiphytic ferns. Clutches consist of two (sometimes three?) white rounded eggs; extrapolating from scant data for relatives, V. diadema eggs probably measure about 19.6 mm × 18.7 mm (0.77 in × 0.74 in).

== Conservation ==
Described from two skins (both females) collected somewhere on New Caledonia before 1860. One has since disappeared. The other is in the MNHN (specimen 762A). The species existed near Oubatche; one bird was shot but could not be preserved. There were rare sightings up to 1880. Other reports on sightings include that of an older local who identified it from a colored plate and claimed to have observed a single bird in shrubland near Lake Yaté "many years ago," possibly in the 1920s; and a forestry official claimed to have twice seen two individuals fly overhead, once in 1953 or 1954 on the La Foa-Canala road, and once on June 3, 1976, W of Mt Panié. However, none of these claims could be confirmed, and all searches have been fruitless. Stokes also reported that collectors coming to New Caledonia to search for this bird offered rewards for live or dead specimens.

Opinion is divided on whether the New Caledonian lorikeet still exists. At least one source lists it as extinct since 1860, which is certainly not correct. Most authors hope someone will yet rediscover the New Caledonian lorikeet. This hope isn't unrealistic, given that the subject would be a very small, inconspicuous bird in a large, wild area that is difficult for ornithological field work. The 1999 rediscovery of Aegotheles savesi, which was known only from a single male skin for 119 years, provides encouragement. A 6-month search expedition to the Mt. Ignambi area in 1998 did not find the species, and locals were not familiar with it. New surveys of highland rainforests are planned for 2006/2007.

Reasons for the species' rarity are unknown. There seems to have been a marked decline in the numbers of two of the other three parrots native to New Caledonia (the New Caledonian red-crowned parakeet and the horned parakeet. Deplanche's lorikeet is still common), also for unknown reasons. New Caledonian bird populations decline wherever habitat is modified, which supports the hypothesis that human interference impacts the birds in a serious way. However, the species' post-1880 decline—if real—took place too early for habitat destruction to have been a decisive factor. Neither could capture for the cage bird trade have influenced the decline. Introduced cats or rats could have been responsible for the decline, or an introduced disease, or a combination of these factors and subtle habitat changes. For example, the large-scale destruction of lowland forest may have deprived the species of a food source they seasonally depended on. The introduction of cats and European rats in the mid-19th century fits the assumed pattern of decline; however, cats probably didn't spread over the whole island until recent times. Rats, especially black rats, which are arboreal, probably represent a serious threat, but the species did not succumb to the prehistoric arrival of the Polynesian rat.

For whatever reason, the New Caledonian lorikeet is an extremely rare and elusive bird. The rarity could be caused in part by the elusiveness. Its relative, the red-throated lorikeet, feared extinct since the beginning of the 20th century, apparently survived in considerable numbers to the 1970s. However, it is more likely V. diadema is genuinely rare. Based on distance between sightings and remaining prime habitat, any remaining populations are probably small and geographically fragmented.

The New Caledonian lorikeet, like most parrots, is listed in CITES Appendix II (since June 6, 1981) and European Union regulation 338/97 Appendix B (since June 1, 1997). It is listed as Critically Endangered - Possibly Extinct by IUCN.
