= Meek's lorikeet =

Conservation status
- Least Concern (IUCN 3.1)

Scientific classification
- Kingdom: Animalia
- Phylum: Chordata
- Class: Aves
- Order: Psittaciformes
- Family: Psittaculidae
- Genus: Vini
- Species: V. meeki

Binomial name
- Vini meeki (Rothschild & Hartert, 1901)

Species of bird

Meek's lorikeet (Vini meeki) is a species of parrot in the family Psittaculidae. It is found on Bougainville Island in Papua New Guinea and the Solomon Islands. Its natural habitats are subtropical or tropical moist lowland forest and subtropical or tropical moist montane forest. It is threatened by habitat loss.

== Taxonomy ==
This species was formerly assigned to the genus Charmosyna. It was moved to the genus Vini based on a molecular phylogenetic study of the lorikeets published in 2020.
