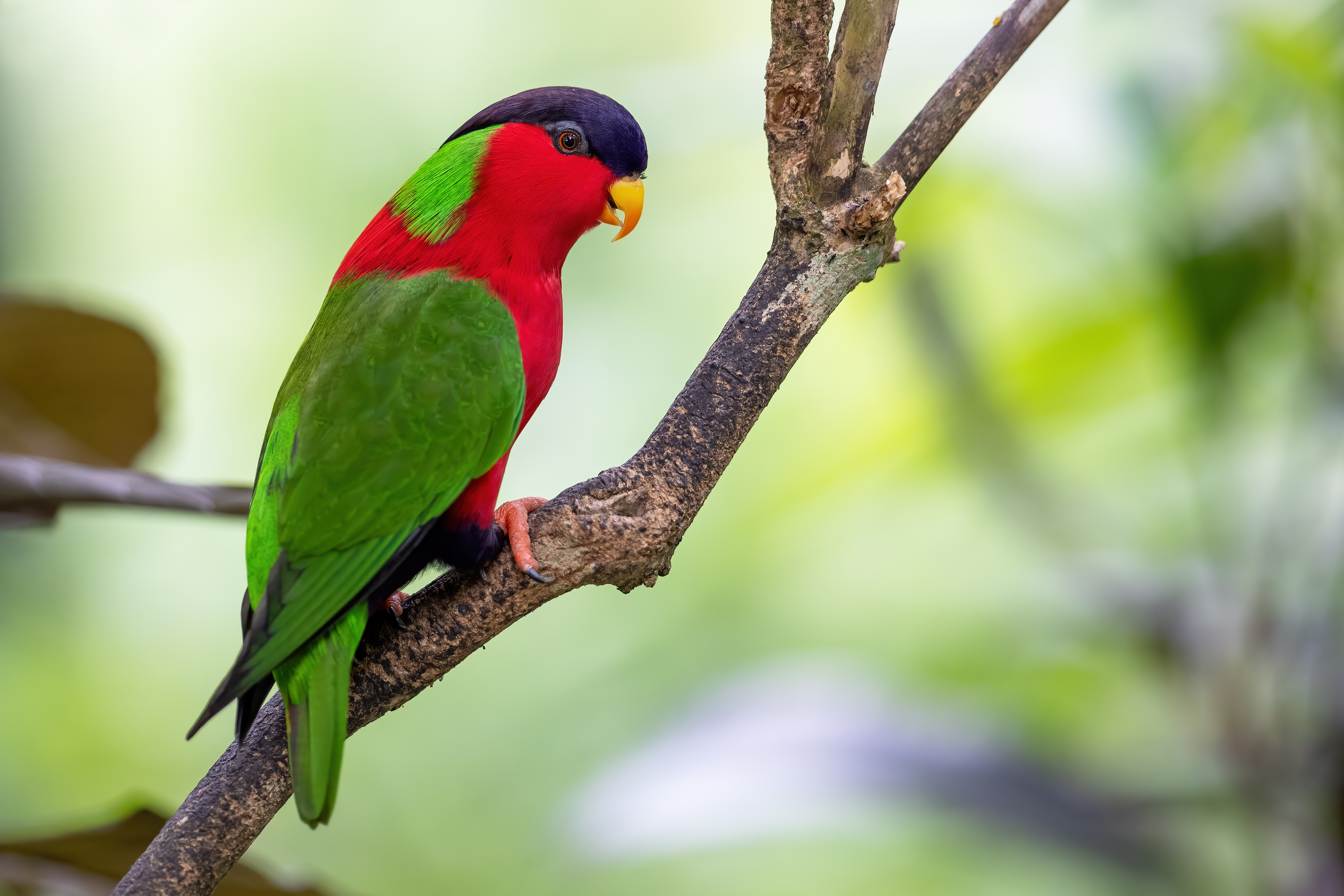

Conservation status
- Least Concern (IUCN 3.1)

Scientific classification
- Kingdom: Animalia
- Phylum: Chordata
- Class: Aves
- Order: Psittaciformes
- Family: Psittaculidae
- Genus: Vini
- Species: V. solitaria

Binomial name
- Vini solitaria (Suckow, 1800)

Synonyms
- Phigys solitarius

= Collared lory =

Species of bird

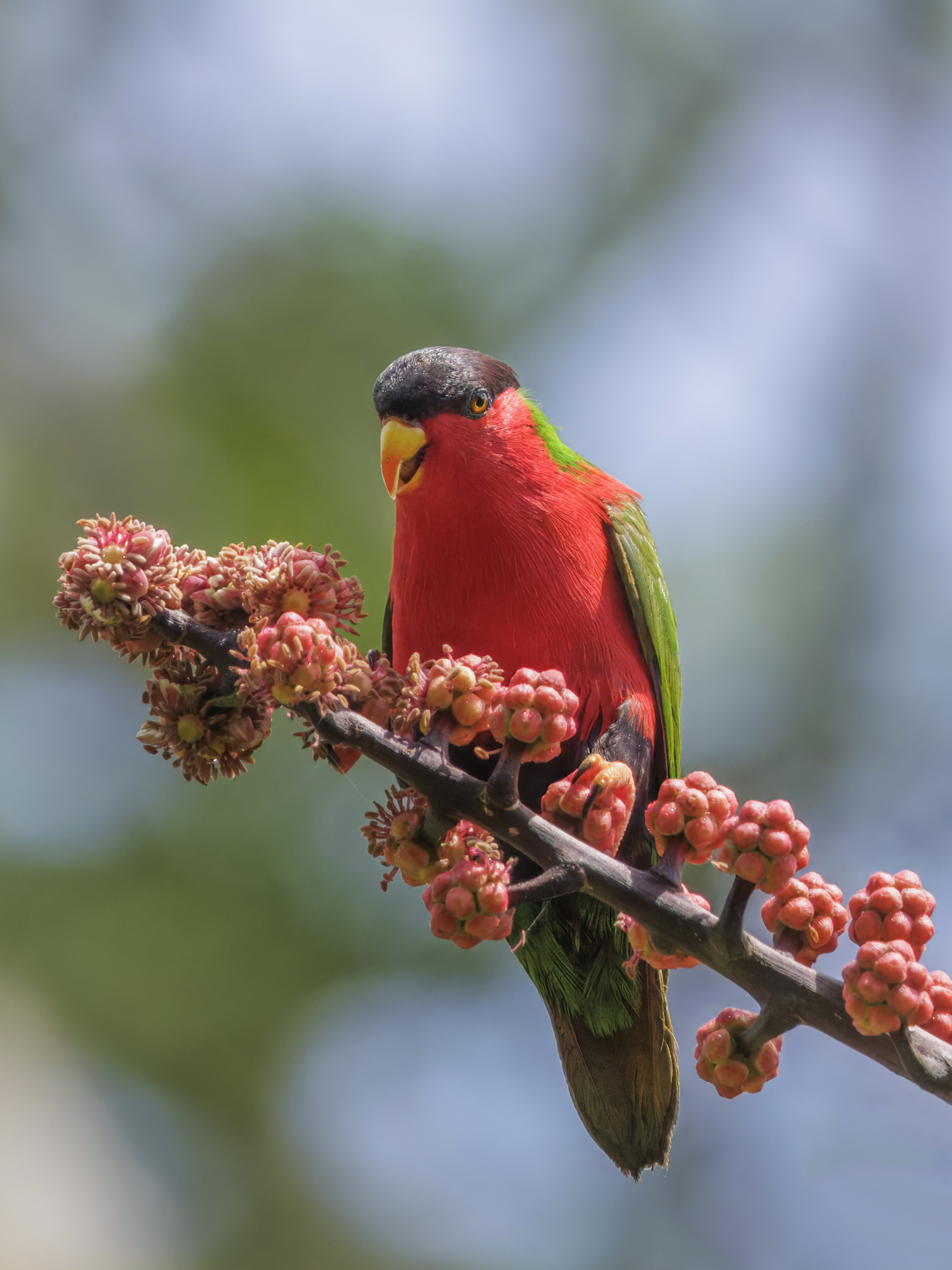
Feeding on Heptapleurum actinophyllum

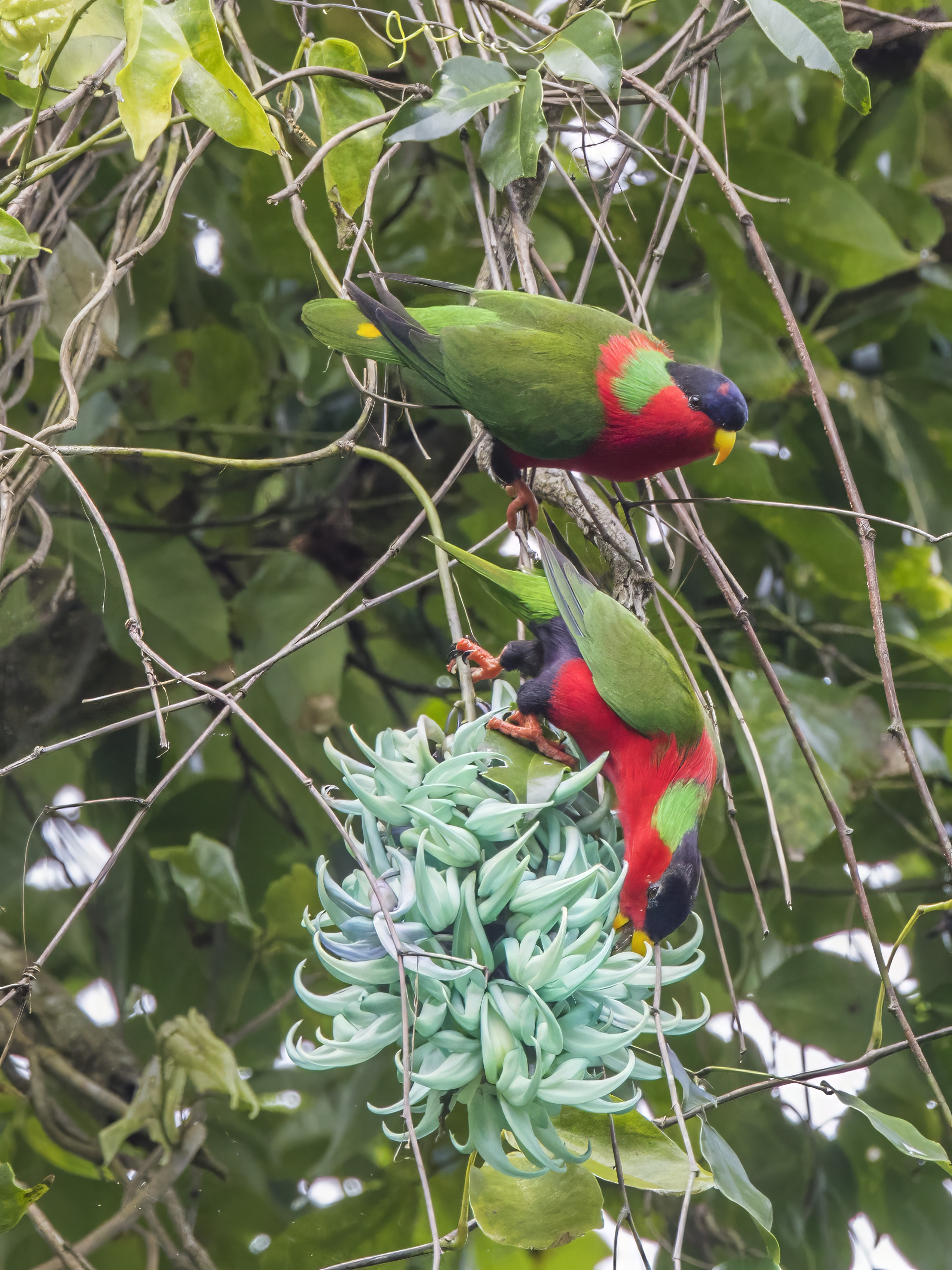
Feeding on Strongylodon macrobotrys

The collared lory (Vini solitaria) is a species of parrot in the family Psittaculidae. It is endemic to the islands of Fiji. It is the only Fijian rainforest bird to adapt to urban landscapes and can be found in urban Suva. Measuring 20 cm (8 in), it has bright red underparts and face with a purple crown and greenish upperparts. Males and females are similar in plumage, although the latter have a paler crown.

== Taxonomy ==
The collared lory was first described by German naturalist Georg Adolf Suckow in 1800, and placed in the genus Phigys by English naturalist George Robert Gray in 1870. It was moved to the genus Vini based on a molecular phylogenetic study of the lorikeets published in 2020.

The Fijian name is kula. The bird was prized throughout western Polynesia for its vibrant plumage and the maritime trading networks based on "kula" feathers existed between Fiji, Samoa, and Tonga up until colonial times. Both the bird and its plumage are called "ula" in Samoan and "kula" in Tongan. Alternate common names include Fiji lory, ruffled lory, and solitary lory. The latter is a misnomer; the species is not solitary.

== Description ==
Adult birds are around 20 cm (8 in) long and exhibit slight sexual dimorphism. The male has bright scarlet cheeks, throat, breast, and upper abdomen. The crown is dark purple. The nape is lime green and red and some of the feathers on the nape are elongated. The wings, back, and tail are greenish. The lower abdomen is purple. The bill is yellow-orange, the feet pink-orange, and the irises are orange-red. The female is similar but with a paler crown that has a greenish hue posteriorly. Juveniles are duller with vague purple transverse striations on the upper abdomen and breast, and they have a brown beak and pale brown irises.

== Distribution and habitat ==
Its natural habitat is subtropical or tropical moist lowland forests. It has adapted to human habitation and can be found in Suva. It occurs on Fiji's larger islands, and on the Lau Islands outwards to Lakeba and Oneata. While the species is today restricted to Fiji, fossil evidence shows that it once occurred in Tonga as well, and was extirpated by early human settlers.

== Behaviour ==
The collared lory is a fast and straight flyer with quick shallow wingbeats, and can be found in pairs or small groups. The call is a high pitched single or double shriek.

=== Feeding ===
The diet of the collared lory consists fruit, seeds, nectar and blossoms. Trees favoured include the drala (Erythrina variegata), the coconut palm (Cocos nucifera) and the introduced and invasive African tulip tree (Spathodea campanulata).

=== Breeding ===
The nest is a hollow in a tree, or sometimes in a hole in a rotting coconut still attached to the tree. The clutch size is two eggs in captivity, the size in the wild is unknown but presumed to be the same. Incubation is around 30 days, and the nestling stage lasts about 9 weeks.

== Aviculture ==
The collared lory was bred and exhibited in London and Taronga Zoos in the early 1940s. The species became tame readily in captivity but early attempts to keep birds alive proved difficult. This species was first bred in the UK (1941) by the Marquess of Tavistock (later the 12th Duke of Bedford), for which he was awarded a commemorative medal by the Foreign Bird League. Not so many recent zoos have this species, but there are some, including Weltvogelpark Walsrode, ZooParc de Beauval, Loro Parque, San Diego Zoo and Kula Eco Park.

Matei, Taveuni, Fiji Isles
