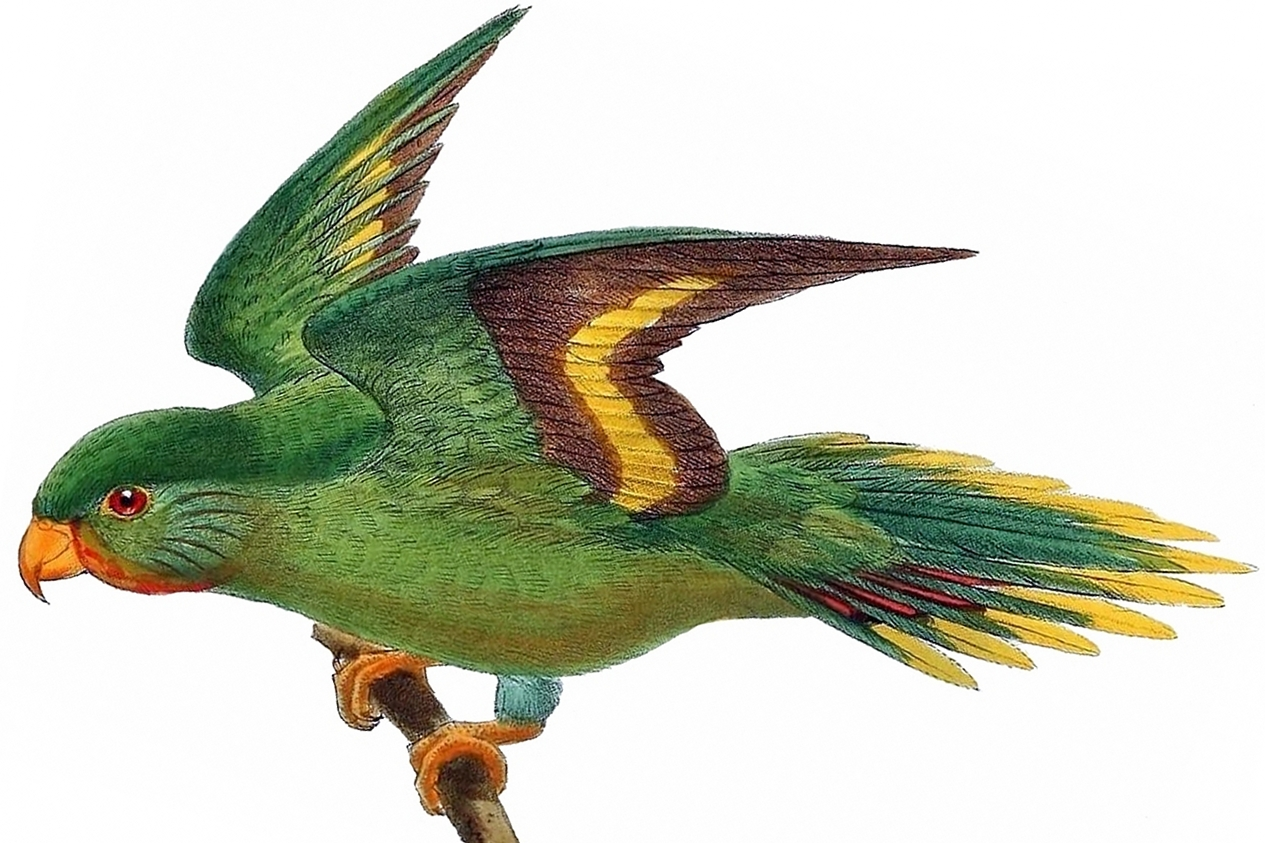

Conservation status
- Least Concern (IUCN 3.1)

Scientific classification
- Kingdom: Animalia
- Phylum: Chordata
- Class: Aves
- Order: Psittaciformes
- Family: Psittaculidae
- Genus: Vini
- Species: V. rubrigularis

Binomial name
- Vini rubrigularis (Sclater, PL, 1881)

= Red-chinned lorikeet =

Species of bird

The red-chinned lorikeet (Vini rubrigularis) is a species of parrot in the family Psittaculidae. It is native to New Britain, New Ireland, New Hannover and Karkar Island in Papua New Guinea.

Its natural habitats are subtropical or tropical moist lowland forest and subtropical or tropical moist montane forest.

== Taxonomy ==
This species was formerly assigned to the genus Charmosyna. It was moved to the genus Vini based on a molecular phylogenetic study of the lorikeets published in 2020.

The species was originally described as Trichoglossus rubrigularis by Philip Sclater in 1881. The generic name Vini is from the Tahitian name for the resident lorikeets. The specific epithet rubrigularis is from the Latin ruber, meaning red, and the Modern Latin gularis, meaning throated. Alternative names for the species include red-chinned lory.

The species is generally recognised as monotypic. However, some authorities split populations from Karkar Island as a distinct subspecies, V. r. krakari.
