= Sinoto's lorikeet =

Sinoto's Lorikieet Temporal range: Holocene

Conservation status
- Extinct

Scientific classification
- Kingdom: Animalia
- Phylum: Chordata
- Class: Aves
- Order: Psittaciformes
- Family: Psittaculidae
- Genus: Vini
- Species: †V. sinotoi

Binomial name
- †Vini sinotoi Steadman & Zarriello 1987

Extinct species of bird

The Sinoto's lorikeet (Vini sinotoi) is a species of parrot that became extinct 700–1300 years ago. It was identified from fossils on the Marquesas Islands.

The species epithet commemorates anthropologist Yosihiko H. Sinoto who collected the holotype in 1965.
