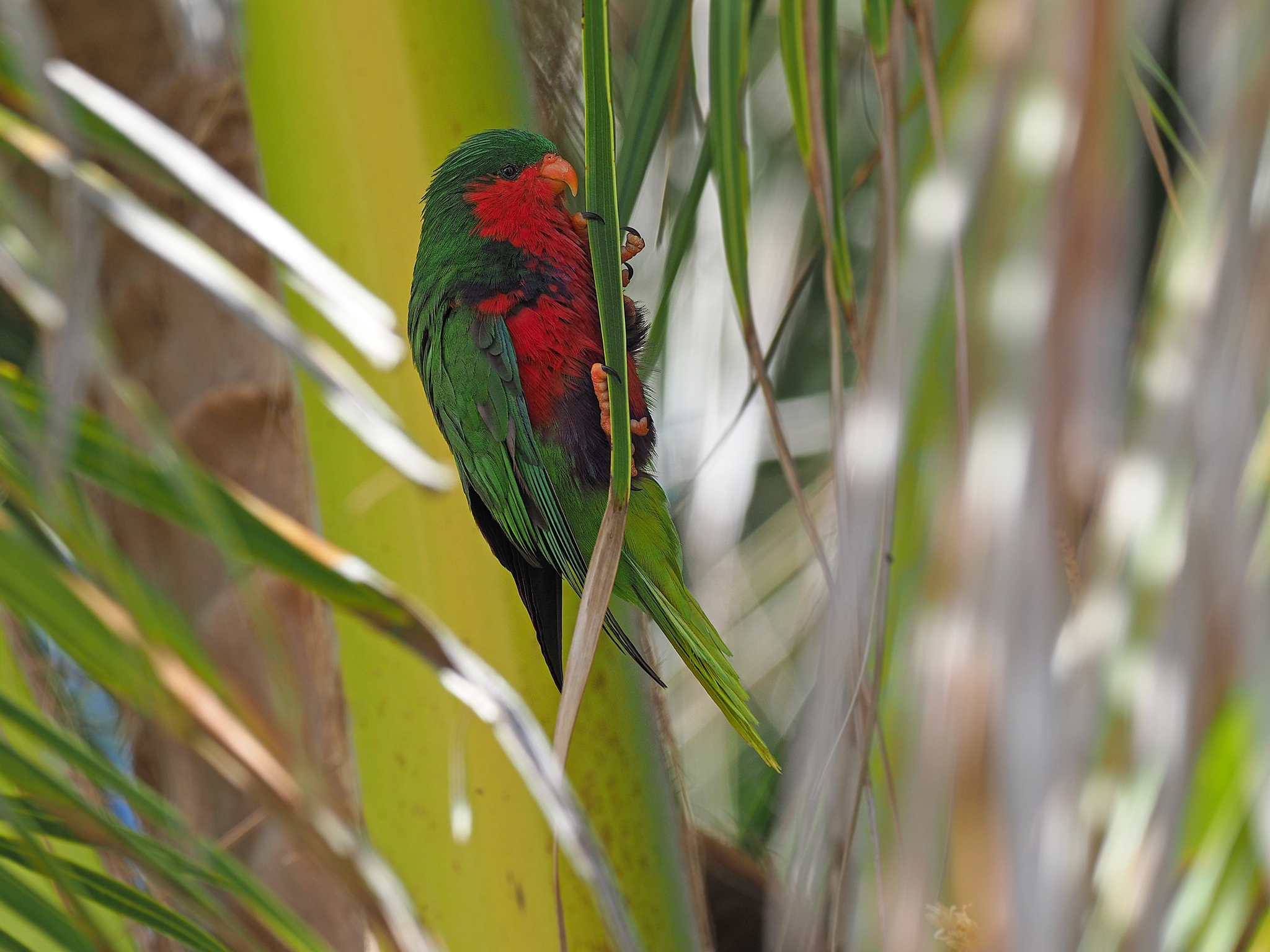

Conservation status
- Vulnerable (IUCN 3.1)

Scientific classification
- Kingdom: Animalia
- Phylum: Chordata
- Class: Aves
- Order: Psittaciformes
- Family: Psittaculidae
- Genus: Vini
- Species: V. stepheni

Binomial name
- Vini stepheni (North, 1908)

= Stephen's lorikeet =

Species of bird

Stephen's lorikeet (Vini stepheni), also known as the Henderson lorikeet or the Henderson Island Lorikeet, is a species of parrot in the family Psittaculidae. It is endemic to Henderson Island in the Pitcairn Islands of the South Pacific.

Its natural habitat is subtropical or tropical moist lowland forest. It is threatened by habitat loss and the accidental introduction of predators to the island.

== Description ==
The lorikeets are 19 cm (7.5 in) in length and weigh 42–55 g (1.5–1.9 oz).

Adults are green on the upper side, with a green occiput and crown. The green color turns into a yellow-green at the base and tail. They have a green underwings, with a green band across the chest that varies in appearance. Their breast is red in color, and turns purple towards their abdomen and thighs. They have a deep orange beak with yellow or orange eyes.

Juvenile Stephen's lorikeets have green underparts with purple or red marks on their throats and abdomens. Their tail tends to be a dark green. They have brown beaks and eyes.

The calls emitted while feeding are soft and twittering. The call made while in flight are louder.

== Behavior and ecology ==
The lorikeets are hard to spot in dense foliage. They are generally found in small groups or flocks. They are known to travel between the inland foliage and coastal palms to feed on coconuts.

=== Diet ===
The diet of the birds is composed of nectar, pollen, fruits, and butterfly and moth larvae. The majority of nectar eaten by the lorikeets comes from the flowers of Scaevola sericea and Timonius polygamus.

=== Reproduction ===
Their breeding season is thought to be around April or the start of May.

=== Threats ===
The lorikeets are assessed as vulnerable by the IUCN. They are thought to have a stable population of 720–1,820 individuals. Due to their extremely limited range, the main threat to the survival of the lorikeets is the accidental introduction of predators to Henderson Island and habitat loss due to deforestation or natural disasters. They, however, seem to have adjusted to the introduction of at least one invasive predator, the Polynesian rat. There has been an unsuccessful attempt to eradicate invasive rodents from Henderson Island.

== Distribution and habitat ==
The lorikeet is endemic to Henderson Island in the Pitcairn Islands. It inhabits coconut palms as well as the dense forest on the interior of the island.
