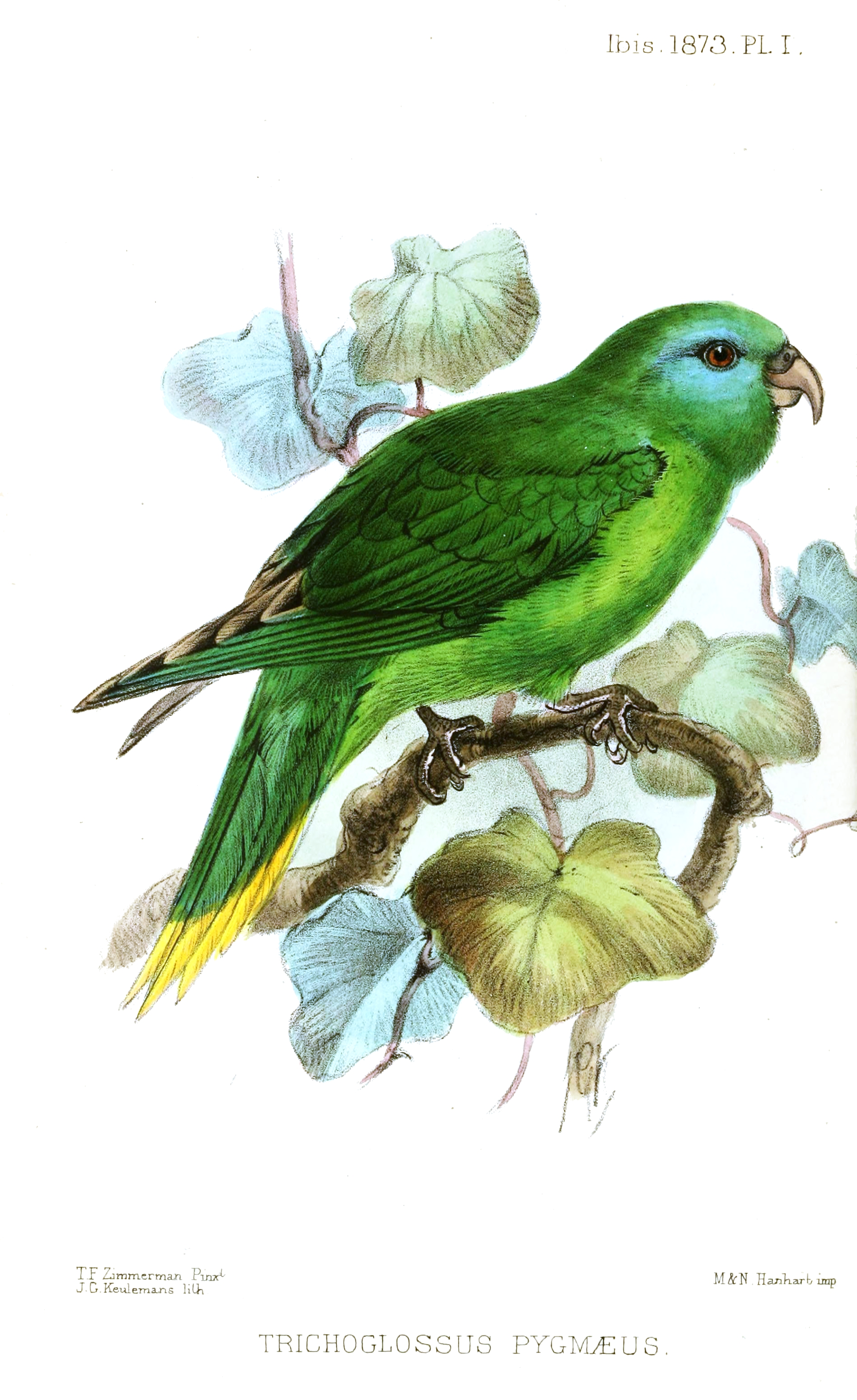

Conservation status
- Vulnerable (IUCN 3.1)

Scientific classification
- Kingdom: Animalia
- Phylum: Chordata
- Class: Aves
- Order: Psittaciformes
- Family: Psittaculidae
- Genus: Vini
- Species: V. palmarum

Binomial name
- Vini palmarum (Gmelin, JF, 1788)

= Palm lorikeet =

Species of bird

The palm lorikeet (Vini palmarum) is a species of parrot in the family Psittaculidae. It is found in the Santa Cruz Islands and Vanuatu. Its natural habitats are subtropical or tropical moist lowland forest, subtropical or tropical moist montane forest and plantations. It is threatened by habitat loss.

== Taxonomy ==
The palm lorikeet was formally described in 1788 by the German naturalist Johann Friedrich Gmelin in his revised and expanded edition of Carl Linnaeus's Systema Naturae. He placed it with all the other parrots in the genus Psittacus and coined the binomial name Psittacus palmarum. Gmelin based his description on the "Palm parrot" that had been described in 1781 by the English ornithologist John Latham in his A General Synopsis of Birds. Latham specified the origin of his specimen as Tanna, one of the islands in the Vanuatu archipelago. The palm lorikeet was formerly placed in the genus Charmosyna. It was moved to the genus Vini based on a molecular phylogenetic study of the lorikeets published in 2020. Vici had been introduced in 1833 by the French naturalist René Lesson.
