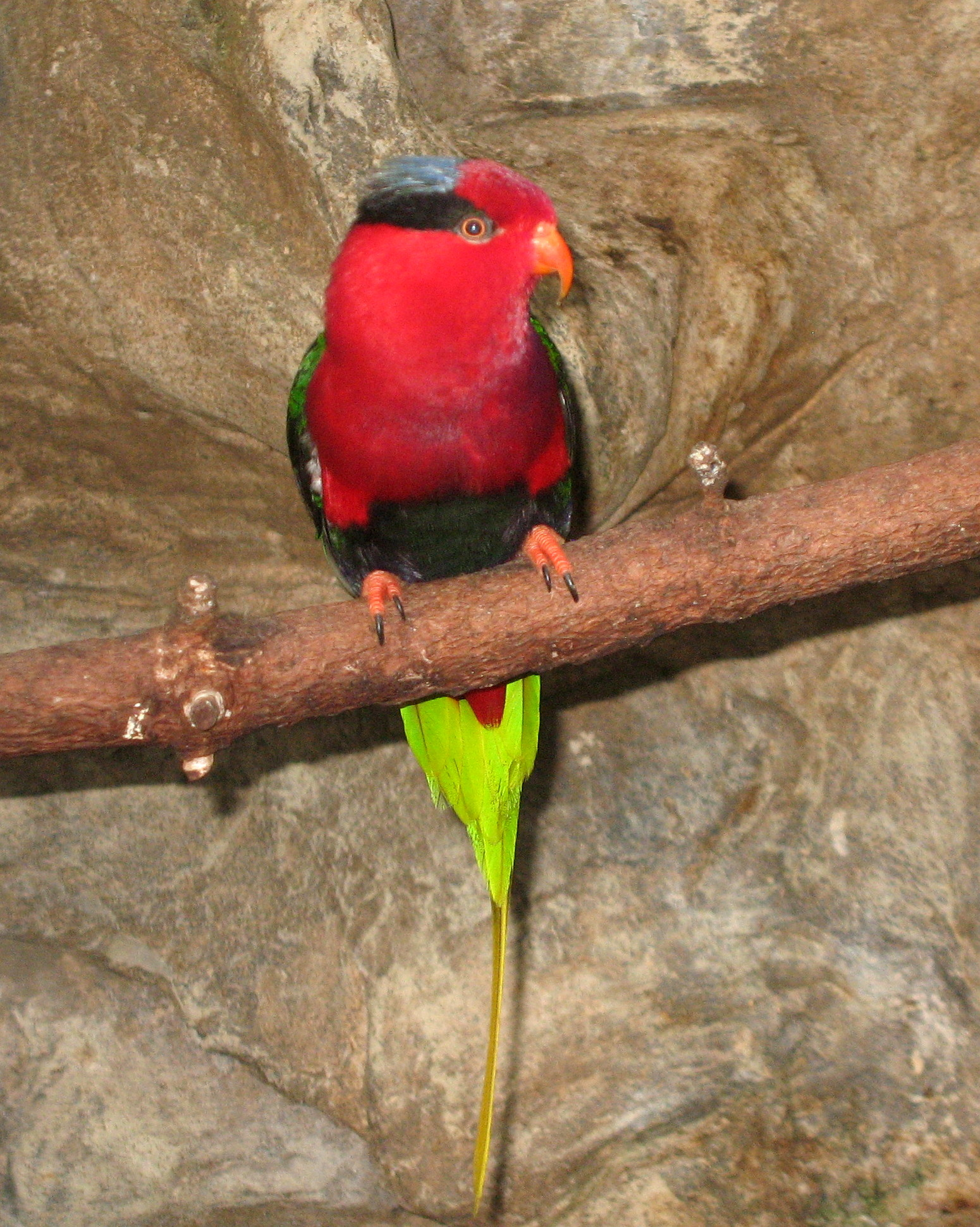
- Charmosyna stellae goliathina at Loro Parque

Conservation status
- Least Concern (IUCN 3.1)

Scientific classification
- Kingdom: Animalia
- Phylum: Chordata
- Class: Aves
- Order: Psittaciformes
- Family: Psittaculidae
- Genus: Charmosyna
- Species: C. stellae

Binomial name
- Charmosyna stellae Meyer, 1886

= Stella's lorikeet =

Species of bird

Stella's lorikeet (Charmosyna stellae) is a species of parrot in the family Psittaculidae. It is endemic to New Guinea, where its natural habitat consists of subtropical or tropical moist montane forests.

== Taxonomy ==
Stella's lorikeet was formerly considered conspecific with the Papuan lorikeet, but phylogenetic evidence indicates that the two are distinct species, and it has been recognized as a separate species by the IUCN Red List, BirdLife International, and the International Ornithologists' Union.

Stella's lorikeet has three recognized subspecies:

- C. s. stellae - southeastern New Guinea
- C. s. goliathina - western and central New Guinea
- C. s. wahnesi - endemic to the Huon Peninsula
