= Striated lorikeet =

Conservation status
- Least Concern (IUCN 3.1)

Scientific classification
- Kingdom: Animalia
- Phylum: Chordata
- Class: Aves
- Order: Psittaciformes
- Family: Psittaculidae
- Genus: Charmosyna
- Species: C. multistriata

Binomial name
- Charmosyna multistriata (Rothschild, 1911)

Synonyms
- Synorhacma multistriata

Species of bird

The striated lorikeet (Charmosyna multistriata) is a species of parrot in the family Psittaculidae native to New Guinea. It was formerly the only species placed in the genus Synorhacma. It is threatened by habitat loss.

== Taxonomy ==
The striated lorikeet was formally described in 1911 by the English zoologist Walter Rothschild under the binomial name Charmosynopsis multistriata. The species is now placed in the genus Charmosyna based on phylogenetic studies of the lorikeets published in 2020.

== Distribution and habitat ==
The species is native to mountain forests of the central mountain ranges in West Papua (province), Indonesia and central Papua New Guinea (particularly the Ok Tedi River region). It is believed to be possibly nomadic.

== Conservation ==
The striated lorikeet's habitat is threatened by deforestation to make way for farms and mines (especially copper and gold), and is also believed to be under pressure from recent severe weather events.
