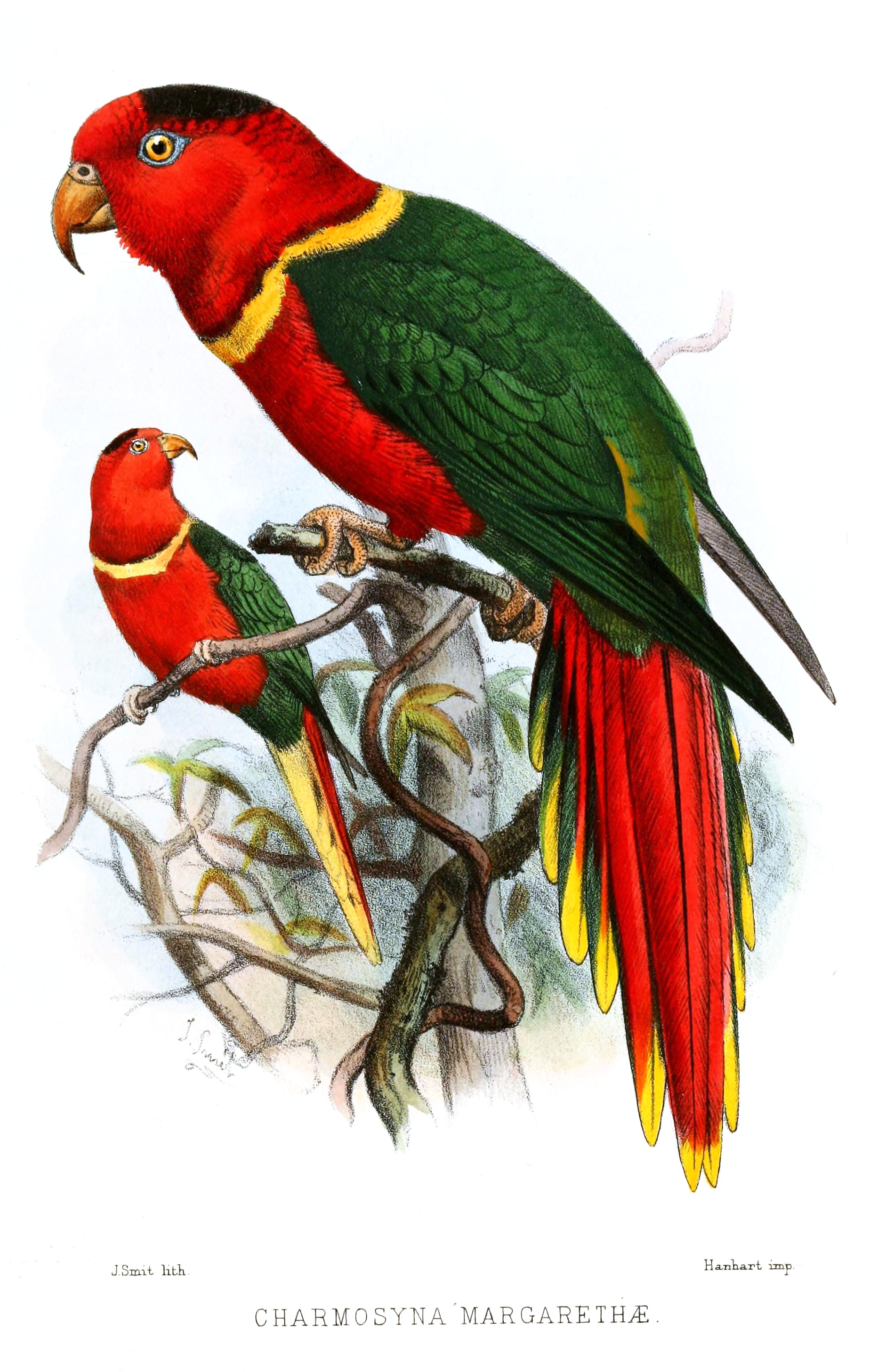

Conservation status
- Least Concern (IUCN 3.1)

Scientific classification
- Kingdom: Animalia
- Phylum: Chordata
- Class: Aves
- Order: Psittaciformes
- Family: Psittaculidae
- Genus: Vini
- Species: V. margarethae

Binomial name
- Vini margarethae (Tristram, 1879)

Synonyms
- Charmosynoides margarethae

= Duchess lorikeet =

Species of bird

The duchess lorikeet (Vini margarethae) is a species of parrot in the family Psittaculidae. It is found throughout the Solomon Islands archipelago. Its natural habitats are subtropical or tropical moist lowland forest, subtropical or tropical moist montane forest, and plantations. It is threatened by habitat loss.

== Taxonomy ==
The duchess lorikeet was formally described in 1879 by the English clergyman and ornithologist Henry Baker Tristram from a specimen collected at Makira Harbour, San Cristoval, Solomon Islands. Tristam coined the binomial name Charmosyna margarethae. The specific epithet was chosen to honour Princess Louise Margaret of Prussia who became the Duchess of Connaught and Strathearn when she married Queen Victoria's son Prince Arthur in 1879. The lorikeet was moved to the genus, Vini, based on a molecular phylogenetic study published in 2020.

== Description ==
The duchess lorikeet is 20 cm (8 in) in length, and weighs 40–60 g (1.4–2.1 oz). An adult is mainly bright red, with purple to black hindcrowns and yellow-orange eyes. It has an orange bill and a wide yellow chest band along with a thin yellow collar on the mantle bordered by a purple or black line. It has a dull mauve to black lower breast, with dull yellow underwings. Its tail are red, with green upper tail coverts and yellow tips. Females look the same as males, but additionally have yellow patches on the side of the rump.

Juvenile lorikeets have black markings on the head and underparts, along with a dusky black patch on the occiput. The breast band is a faint yellow and the yellow collar on the mantle has a dusky wash. They have a brown to black bill, with grey eyes.

== Distribution and habitat ==
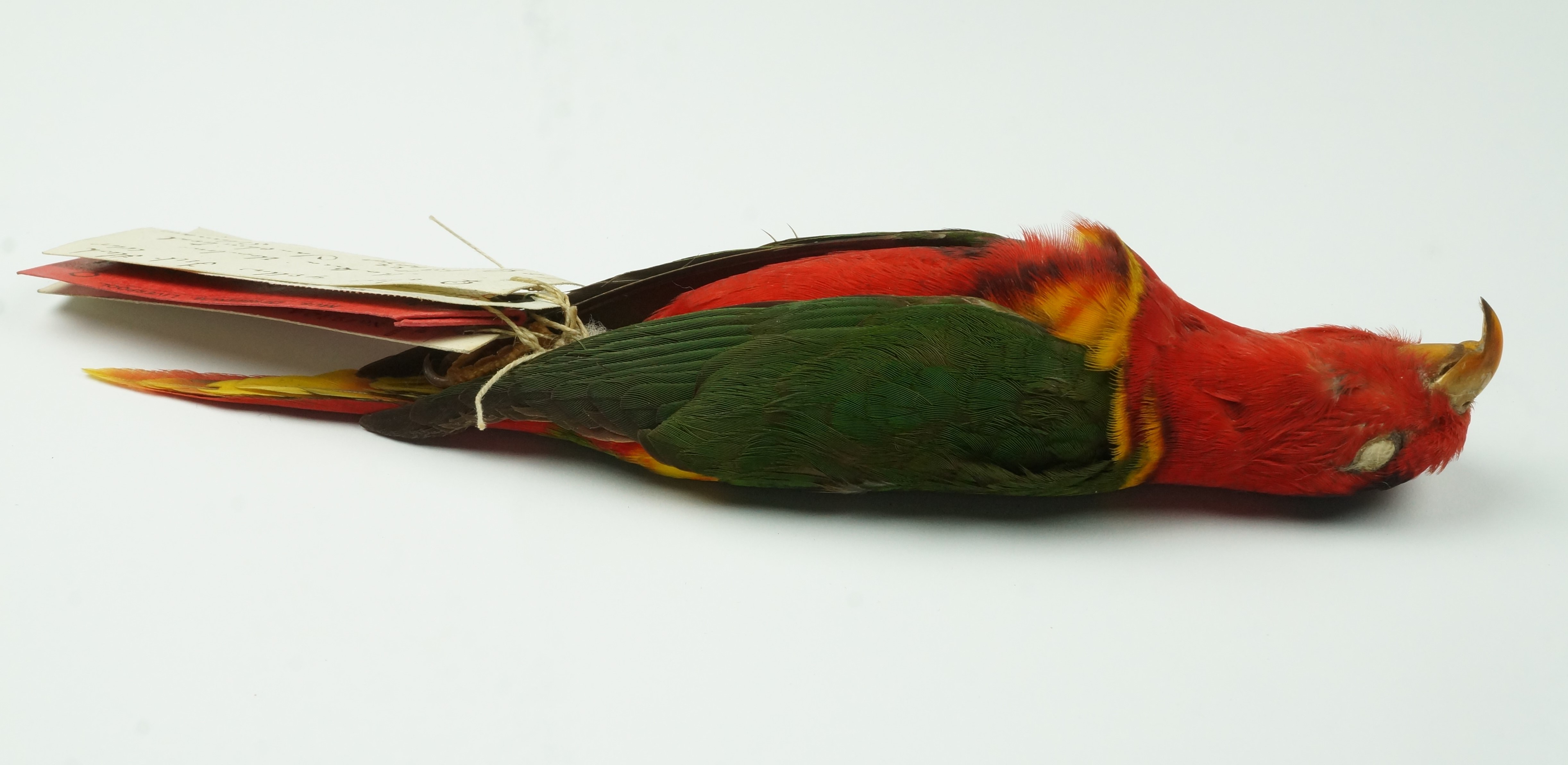
Holotype of Charmosyna margarethae Tristram (NML-VZ T12204) held at World Museum, National Museums Liverpool.

The species is found only on Bougainville Island and 6 islands in the Solomon Islands. It is a localised species that is absent from large areas of habitat in its range that are potentially suitable for it. It is most often found in lower montane forest and in coconut plantations. It is found from sea level to an elevation of 1,350 m (4,430 ft) asl. It may be nomadic and inhabit habitats at different altitudes.

== Behavior and ecology ==
The calls of the duchess lorikeet are generally more squeaky than that of other species of lorikeets. Their flight calls are loud and high-pitched, while high-pitched screek notes are made while feeding.

=== Food and feeding ===
The lorikeet mostly feed on nectar, pollen, and small fruits, especially Schefflera.

=== Threats ===
Much of the lowland forest in its range is scheduled to be logged, although it could survive at higher altitudes. Another threat to the species is the possibility of large scale pet trade.

== In culture ==
It was featured on a stamp for the Solomon Islands made in 1975.

== Status ==
The species is widespread and relatively common through its range, but the population may decline rapidly in the future if large scale pet trade begins. The species is considered to be of Least Concern by BirdLife International and the IUCN.

== Aviculture ==
The species is traded in the pet trade, but there is an export quota of 60 birds per year to avoid population decline.
