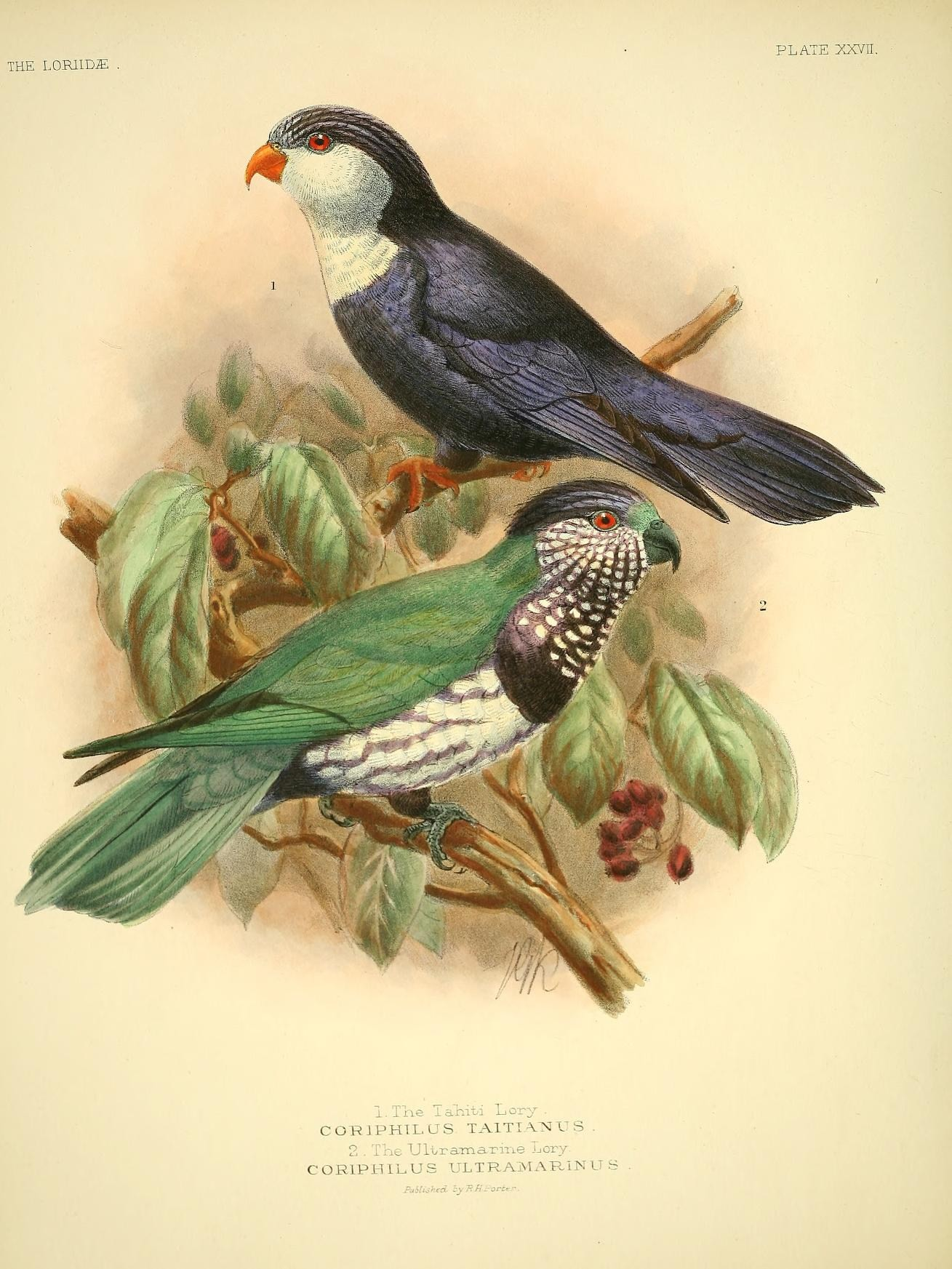
- Vini ultramarina (below), with Vini peruviana

Conservation status
- Critically Endangered (IUCN 3.1)
- CITES Appendix I

Scientific classification
- Kingdom: Animalia
- Phylum: Chordata
- Class: Aves
- Order: Psittaciformes
- Family: Psittaculidae
- Genus: Vini
- Species: V. ultramarina

Binomial name
- Vini ultramarina (Kuhl, 1820)

= Ultramarine lorikeet =

Species of bird

The ultramarine lorikeet (Vini ultramarina) is a species of parrot in the family Psittaculidae, endemic to the Marquesas Islands. Its natural habitats are subtropical or tropical moist lowland forest, subtropical or tropical moist montane forest and plantations. It is critically endangered, threatened mainly by introduction of the black rat and by deforestation.

== Distribution and Population ==
During the 1970s, the bird was still prevalent on its natural range of Fatu Hiva, Ua Pou, Nuku Hiva, and Ua Huka in the Marquesas Islands. However, due to heavy deforestation and predation by the invasive black rat and cat, the ultramarine lorikeet became extinct on Fatu Hiva, Ua Pu, and Nuku Hiva by 2008. Nowadays, the rare bird only remains on Ua Huka. On Ua Huka, the population is estimated to be at about 1,000-2,499 individual birds.

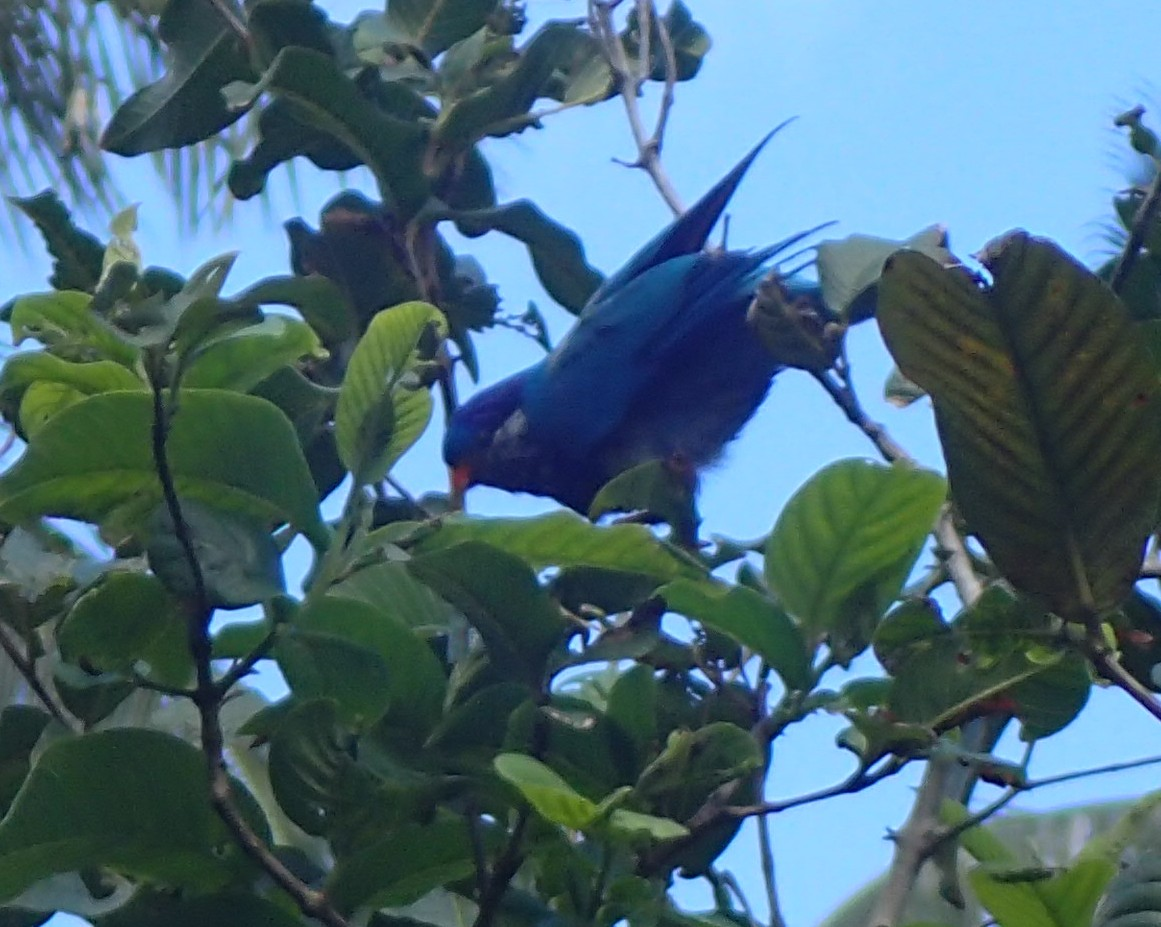
An ultramarine lorikeet in Hane, Ua Huka, Marquesas Islands

== Ecology ==
Vini ultramarina feeds on a large variety of nectar, pollen, and flowers from various flowering trees. It seems to prefer flowers of the coconut palm and Hibiscus tiliaceus. The bird's diet also includes multiple fruits and insects. The ultramarine lorikeet nests in tree cavities, especially in Artocarpus altilis, Pometia pinnata, Pandanus tectorius, and Hibiscus tiliaceus. Little else is known about this rare species.

== Threats ==
The ultramarine lorikeet is greatly threatened by the predation from the black rat which has greatly decreased its population since its introduction to Nuku Hiva in 1915. All islands have been devastated by extremely high levels of grazing and fire. Most of the original dry forest has been reduced to grassland, and terrible damage has been caused to upland forests as well. Deforestation to make way for farms, logging, and tourism has also had large impact in the decline of its population.
