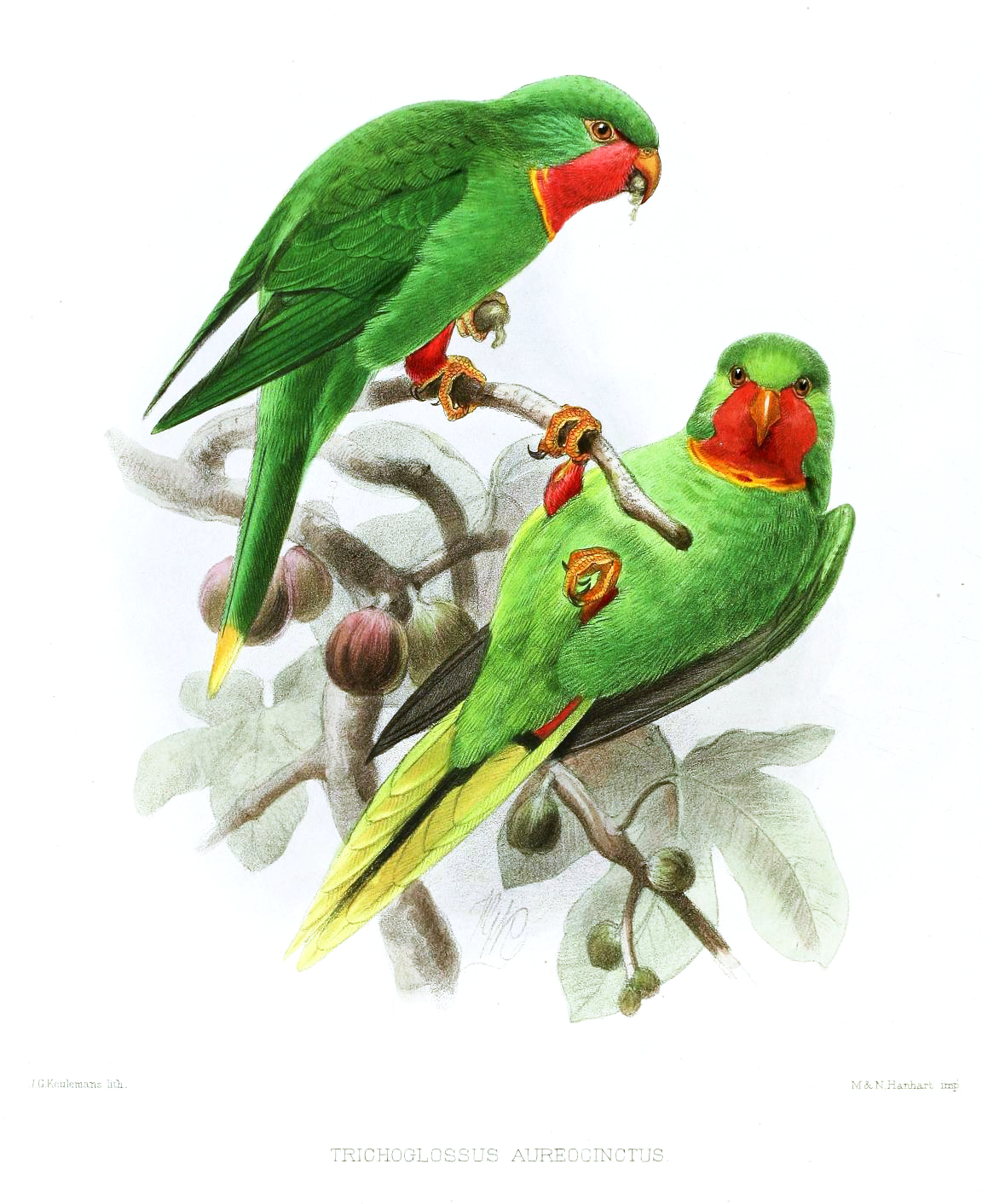

Conservation status
- Critically Endangered (IUCN 3.1)

Scientific classification
- Kingdom: Animalia
- Phylum: Chordata
- Class: Aves
- Order: Psittaciformes
- Family: Psittaculidae
- Genus: Vini
- Species: V. amabilis

Binomial name
- Vini amabilis (Ramsay, 1875)

Synonyms
- Charmosyna amabilis (Ramsay, 1875)

= Red-throated lorikeet =

Species of bird

The red-throated lorikeet (Vini amabilis) is a critically endangered lorikeet endemic to Fiji. It is 18 cm (7.1 in) long and is bright green overall, with red cheeks, throat and thighs.

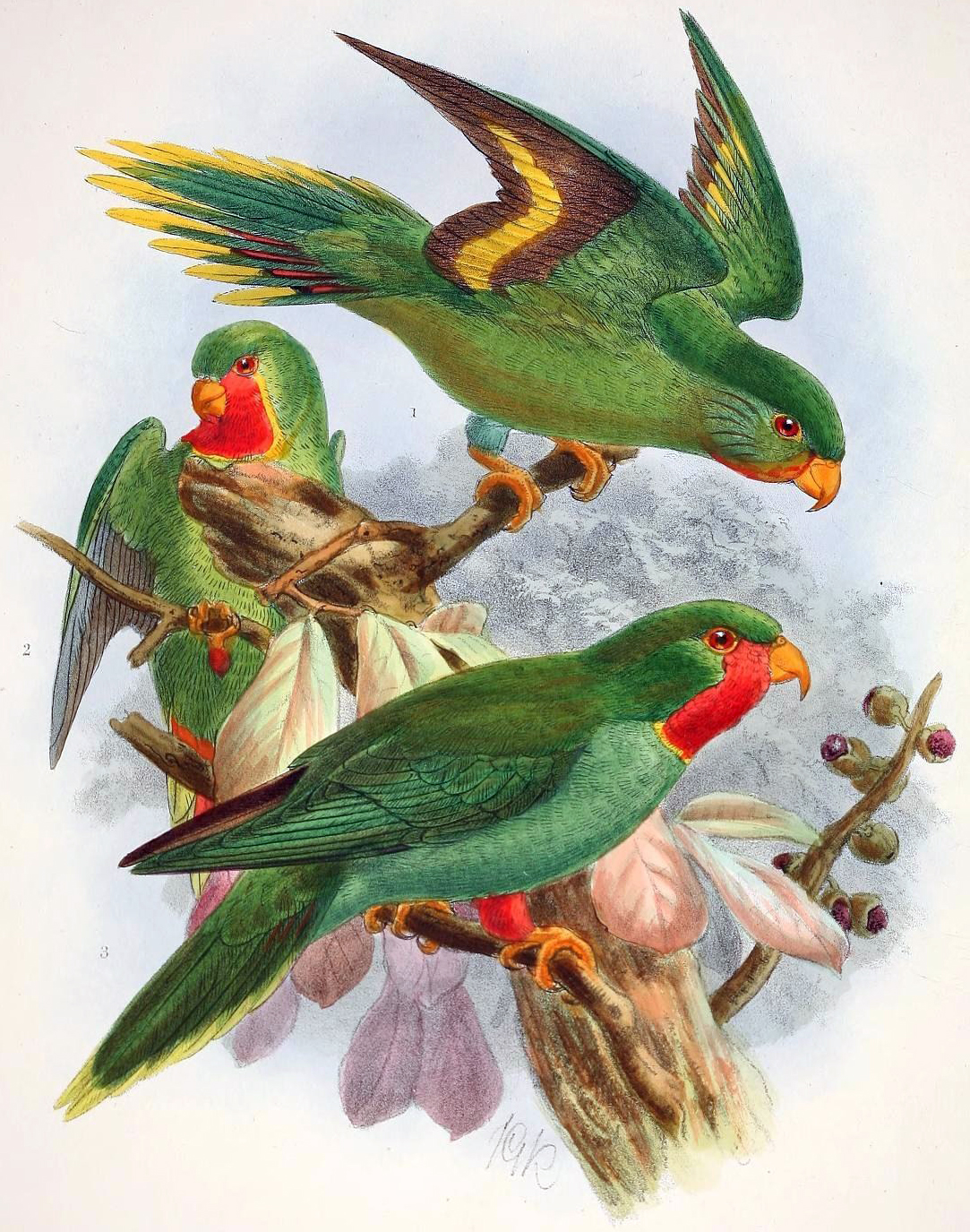
Artwork by John Gerard Keulemans

This bird has been found on the islands of Viti Levu, Vanua Levu, Taveuni and Ovalau. Ten specimens were collected in 1923, but it was last recorded in 1993, although it may also have been seen on Mount Tomanivi on Viti Levu in 2001. A search of Viti Levu in 2001-2 failed to find any birds, as did a second series of surveys in 2003. It continues to be threatened by habitat loss, the introduced black rat, as well as introduced feral cats and small Indian mongooses. It is known as the Kulawai in Fiji and is the bird found on the Fijian $5 bills.

== Taxonomy ==
This species was formerly assigned to the genus Charmosyna. It was moved to the genus Vini based on a molecular phylogenetic study of the lorikeets published in 2020.
