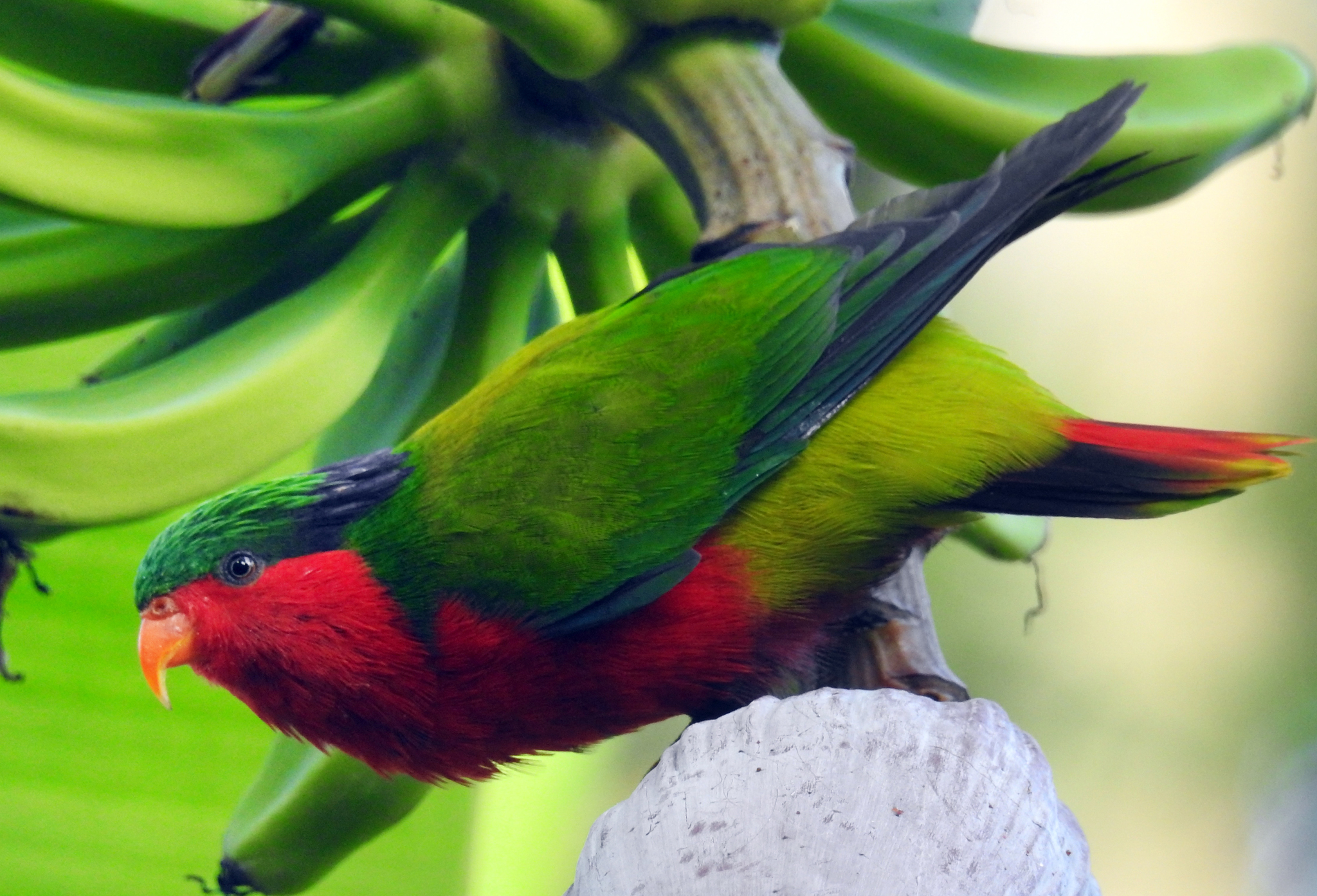

Conservation status
- Endangered (IUCN 3.1)

Scientific classification
- Kingdom: Animalia
- Phylum: Chordata
- Class: Aves
- Order: Psittaciformes
- Family: Psittaculidae
- Genus: Vini
- Species: V. kuhlii

Binomial name
- Vini kuhlii (Vigors, 1824)

Synonyms
- Coriphilus kuhli (lapsus); Coriphilus kuhlii

= Kuhl's lorikeet =

Species of bird

Kuhl's lorikeet (Vini kuhlii), also called the Rimitara lorikeet, Kuhl's lory, manu 'ura (local appellation) or kura (Cook Islands), is a species of lorikeet in the family Psittaculidae. It is one of several species of Vini lorikeets found in islands ranging across the South Pacific. Nicholas Aylward Vigors named it kuhlii in 1824 after Heinrich Kuhl, a German ornithologist whose survey of the parrots Conspectus psittacorum had appeared in 1819.

== Description ==
It is a fast flying lorikeet with vibrant plumage; a green back, wings and crown, a blue nape and legs and bright red undersides and cheeks. The average length is 19 centimetres (7.5 in) and the average weight is 55 grams (1.9 oz).

== Habitat ==
The Kuhl's lorikeet's habitat is natural tropical moist lowland forests and plantations. Like all Vini lorikeets it is a nectarivore, and has a brushy tongue to acquire the nectar. In islands denuded of native forests and covered with extensive coconut plantations it is found exclusively in those areas. It was once present in the Cook Islands but is now restricted to islands of French Polynesia (Only found on the island of Rimatara) and has been introduced in Kiribati. It was reintroduced to Atiu, in the Cook Islands in 2007.

== Threats ==
On the Cook Islands, the Kuhl's lorikeet has been exploited for its red feathers. They are also trapped for the international bird trade. Black rats were introduced to their native range by Europeans and are now predators of the lorikeet. The bird also faces competition and the disturbances of nests from the common myna.

== Status and conservation ==
Studies of fossils have shown that it once had a widespread distribution from the Cook Islands to French Polynesia. Its range contracted greatly after the arrival of humans, until the only surviving natural population was on Rimatara in the Austral Islands of Southern French Polynesia. Like many island species, Kuhl's lorikeet is threatened by introduced black rats. Its colourful feathers have also meant that the species was regularly hunted. The species was also introduced to several islands in Kiribati. The last native population was protected by a tapu or taboo by Queen Tamaeva V of Rimatara around 1900. In 2007 a population was reintroduced to the black-rat-free island of Atiu in the Cook Islands by the Cook Islands Natural Heritage Trust and numerous conservation bodies, including the San Diego Zoo Institute for Conservation Research. In 2008, the introduced population was found to be reproducing. In 2019, successful reproduction resulted in an estimated population of over 400 individuals on the island of Atiu.
