= Parrots of New Guinea =

New Guinea is governed by the nations of Papua New Guinea and Indonesia, which were identified among the top-10 highest priority countries for parrot conservation in the world, due to their parrot diversity, endemism, and threats.

The island of New Guinea is home to 46 native species of parrots, which makes it the third most diverse biogeographic region in parrot diversity, after the continent of South America which harbours about 100 species and Australia which has 57 species. But considering that the area of New Guinea is at least 8 times smaller than these two zones, it makes New Guinea's parrot diversity truly spectacular. New Guinea shares three species of cockatoos and five other species of parrots with neighbouring Australia and other islands. 38 species of parrots are endemic to the island of New Guinea and minor offshore islands.

Although only 7% of the parrot species are threatened in New Guinea, many are very poorly known, and further information may lead to revisions of their Red List status. Most of the threatened species inhabit the satellite islands of New Guinea, with the exception of Pesquet’s parrot (Psittrichas fulgidus), which lives on the mainland.

== Species List ==
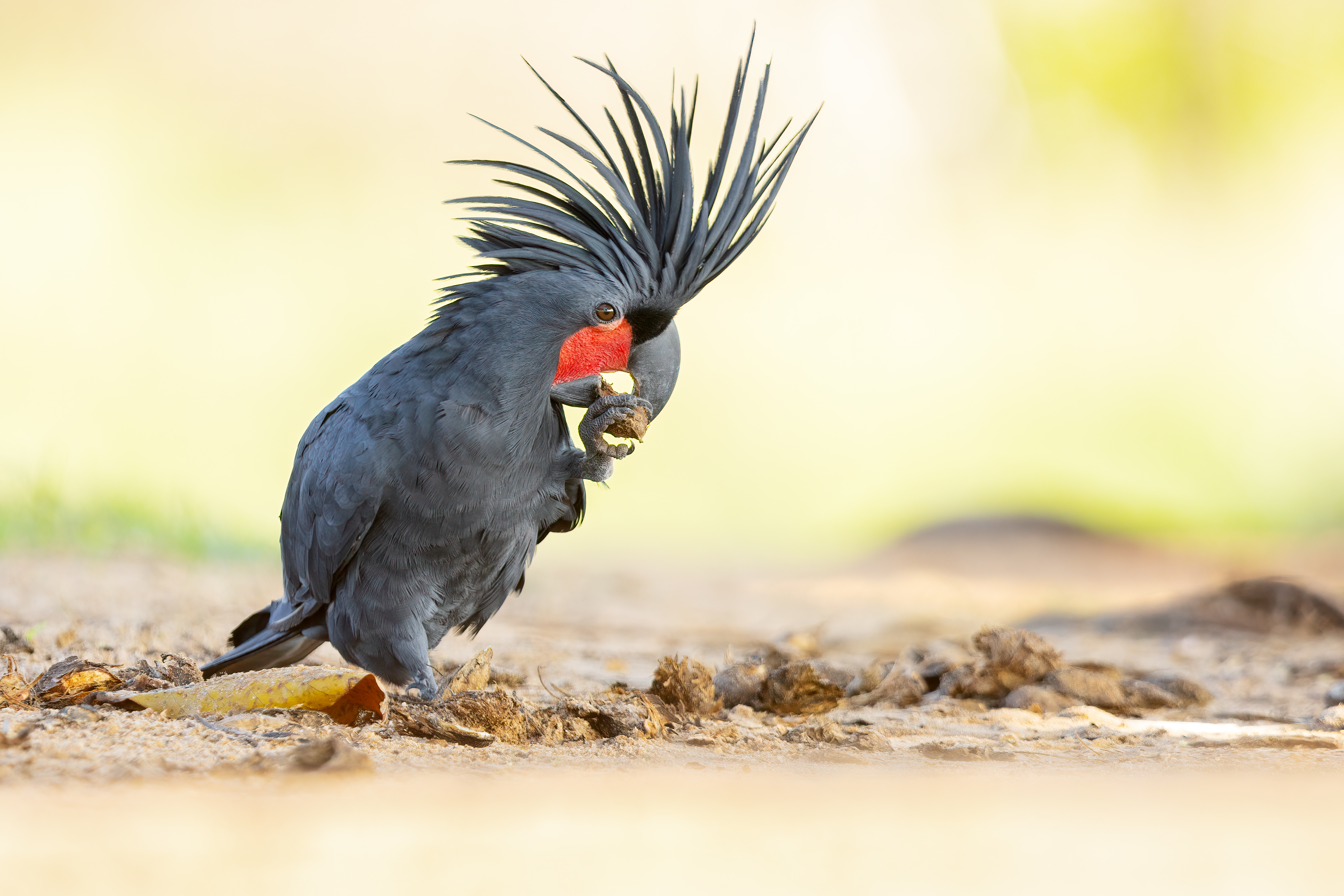
Palm cockatoo (Probosciger aterrimus)

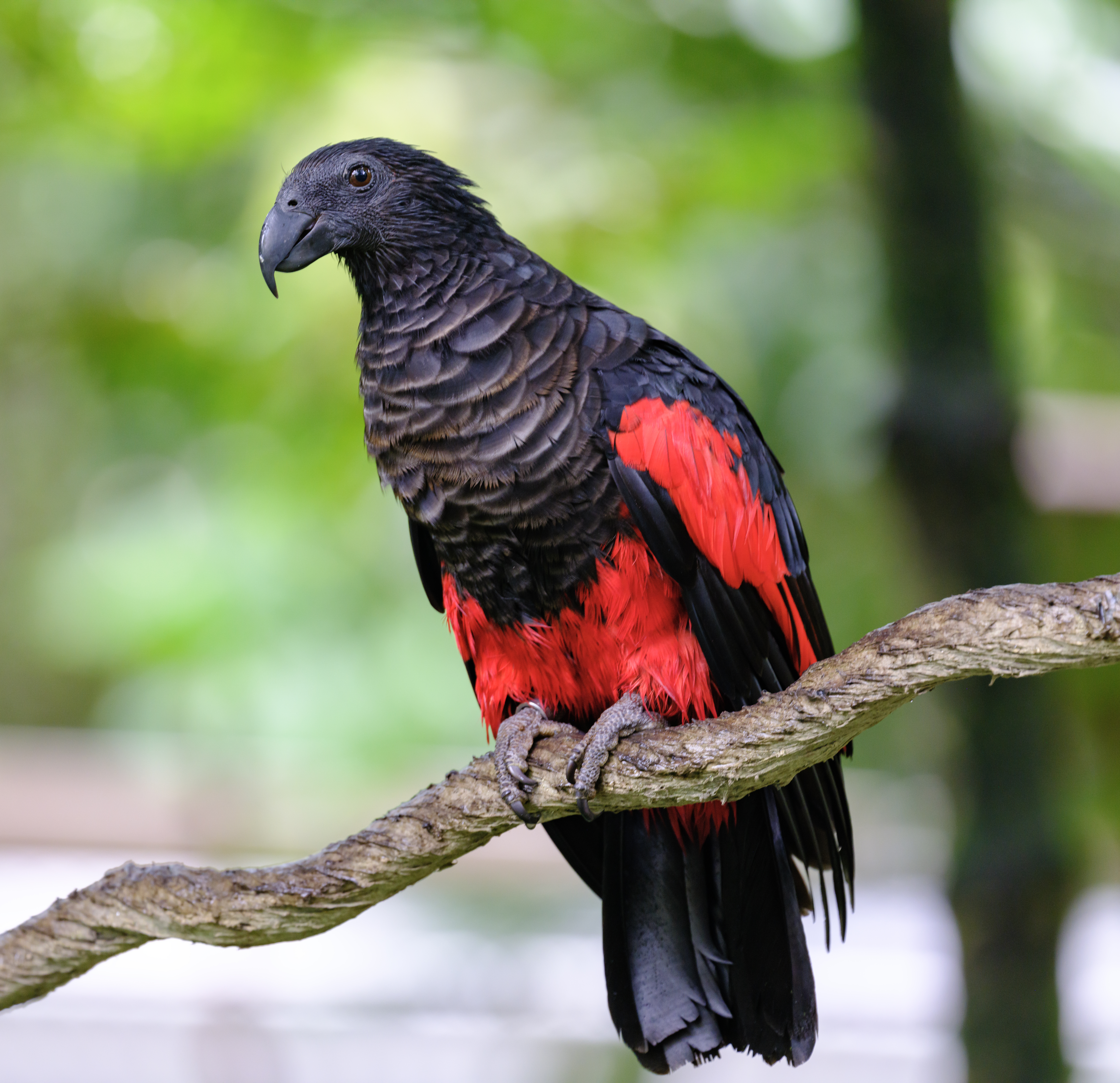
Pesquet's parrot (Psittrichas fulgidus)

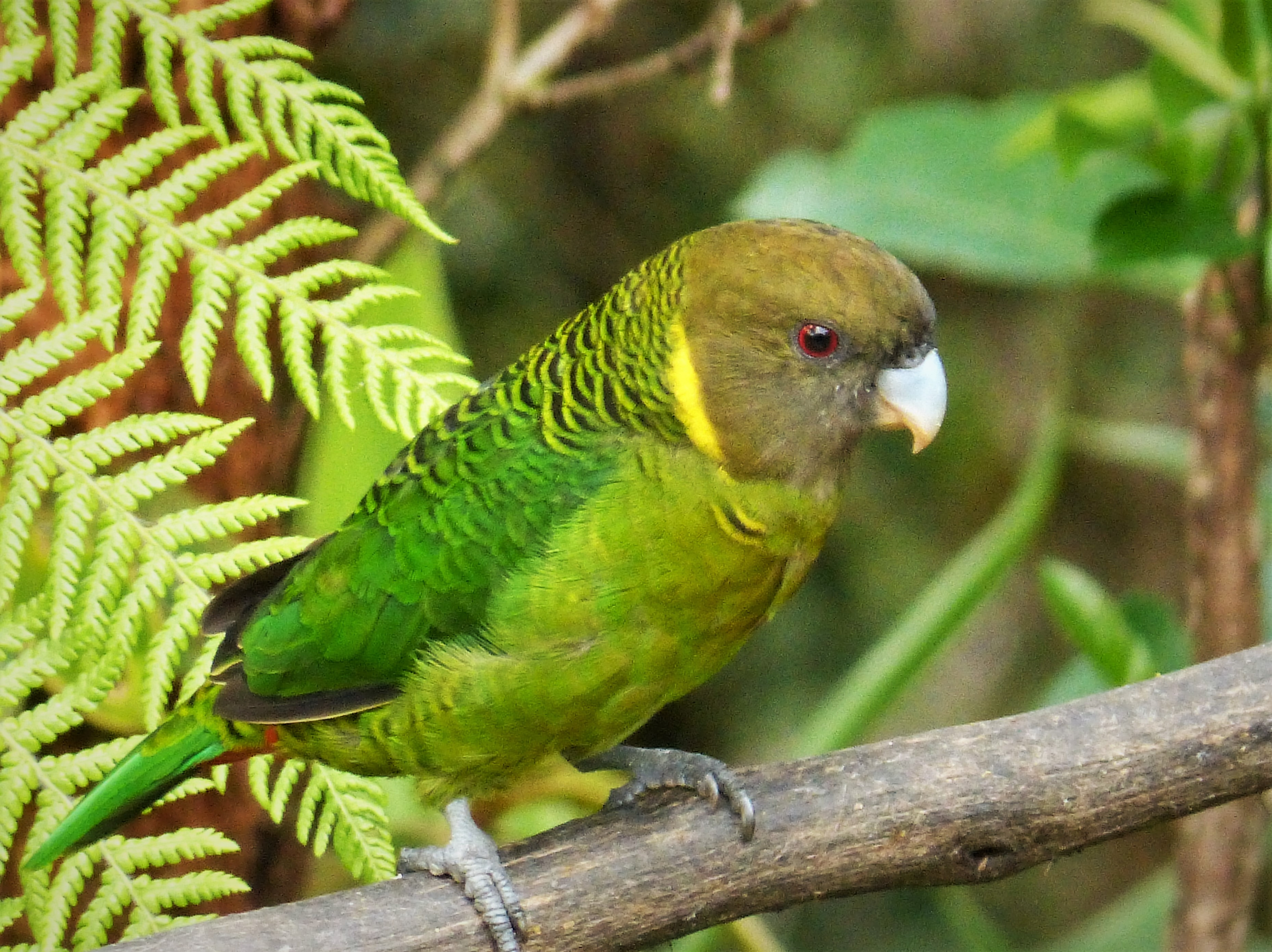
Brehm's tiger parrot (Psittacella brehmii)

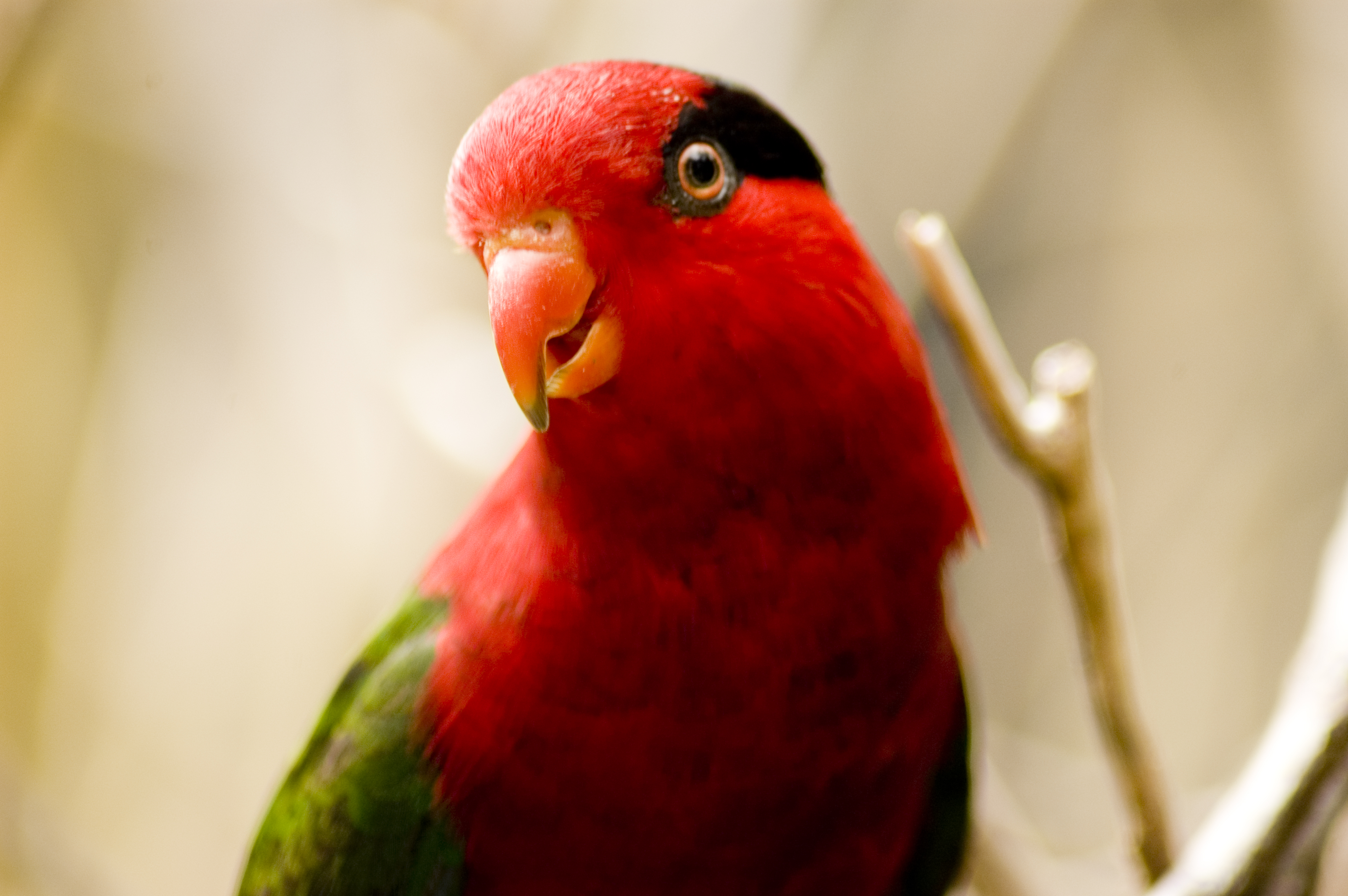
West Papuan lorikeet (Charmosyna papou)

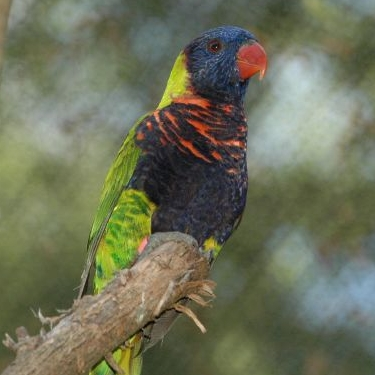
Biak lorikeet (Trichoglossus rosenbergii)

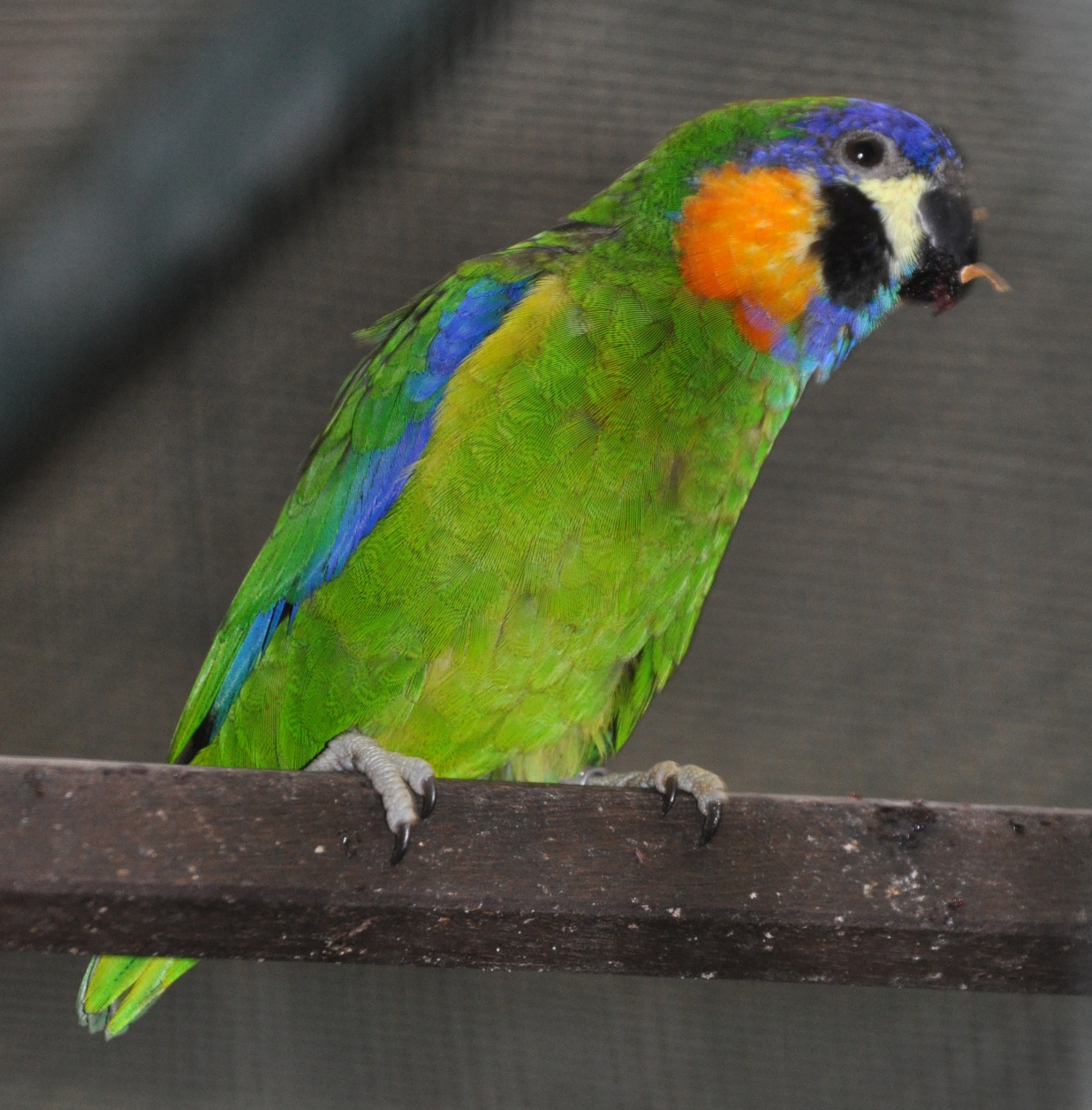
Blue-fronted fig parrot (Cyclopsitta gulielmitertii)

Parrot species listed here based on Avibase New Guinea checklist (IOC version 15.1 taxonomy). Endemic species are marked via an asterisk (*).

=== Cacatuidae ===
- Palm cockatoo
- Little corella
- Sulphur-crested cockatoo

=== Psittaculidae ===
- Pesquet's parrot*
- Yellow-capped pygmy parrot
- Geelvink pygmy parrot*
- Buff-faced pygmy parrot*
- Red-breasted pygmy parrot
- Moluccan king parrot
- Papuan king parrot*
- Red-winged parrot
- Papuan eclectus
- Red-cheeked parrot
- Blue-collared parrot*
- Song parrot
- Great-billed parrot
- Brehm's tiger parrot*
- Painted tiger parrot*
- Modest tiger parrot*
- Madarasz's tiger parrot*
- Plum-faced lorikeet*
- Pygmy lorikeet*
- Red-fronted lorikeet*
- Red-flanked lorikeet
- Fairy lorikeet*
- Striated lorikeet*
- Josephine's lorikeet*
- West Papuan lorikeet*
- Stella's lorikeet
- Red-chinned lorikeet
- Yellow-billed lorikeet*
- Orange-billed lorikeet*
- Purple-bellied lory
- Black-capped lory*
- Dusky lory*
- Brown lory*
- Black lory*
- Yellow-streaked lory*
- Goldie's lorikeet*
- Black-winged lory*
- Violet-necked lory
- Coconut lorikeet
- Biak lorikeet*
- Rainbow lorikeet
- Large fig parrot*
- Edwards's fig parrot*
- Salvadori's fig parrot*
- Blue-fronted fig parrot*
- Black-fronted fig parrot
- Dusky-cheeked fig parrot
- Double-eyed fig parrot
- Orange-fronted hanging parrot*
