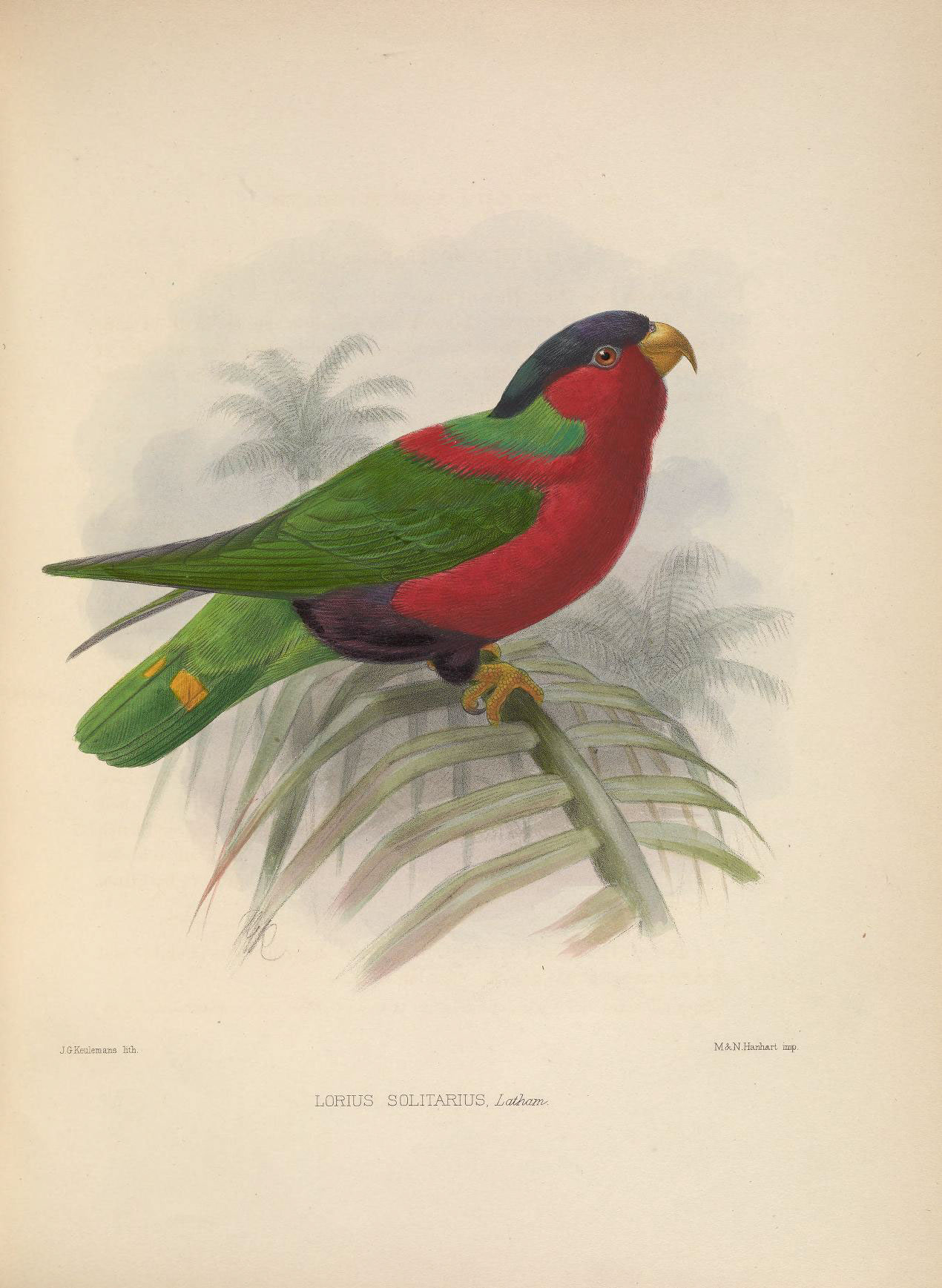
- Collared lory (Vini solitaria), 1876

Scientific classification
- Kingdom: Animalia
- Phylum: Chordata
- Class: Aves
- Order: Psittaciformes
- Family: Psittaculidae
- Subfamily: Loriinae
- Tribe: Loriini; Selby, 1836

Genera
- Oreopsittacus; Charminetta; Hypocharmosyna; Charmosynopsis; Charmosyna; Vini; Neopsittacus; Lorius; Psitteuteles; Chalcopsitta; Glossoptilus; Trichoglossus

= Loriini =

Tribe of birds

Loriini is a tribe of small to medium-sized arboreal parrots characterized by their specialized brush-tipped tongues for feeding on nectar of various blossoms and soft fruits, preferably berries. The species form a monophyletic group within the parrot family Psittaculidae. The group consists of the lories and lorikeets. Traditionally, they were considered a separate subfamily (Loriinae) from the other subfamily (Psittacinae) based on the specialized characteristics, but recent molecular and morphological studies show that the group is positioned in the middle of various other groups. They are widely distributed throughout the Australasian region, including south-eastern Asia, Polynesia, Papua New Guinea, Timor Leste and Australia, and the majority have very brightly coloured plumage.

== Etymology ==
The word "lory" comes from the Malay lūri, a name used for a number of species of colourful parrots. The name was used by the Dutch writer Johan Nieuhof in 1682 in a book describing his travels in the East Indies. The spelling "laurey" was used by English naturalist Eleazar Albin in 1731 for a species of parrot from Brazil, and then in 1751 the English naturalist George Edwards used the spelling "lory" when introducing names for five species of parrot from the East Indies in the fourth volume of his A Natural History of Uncommon Birds. Edwards credited Nieuhof for the name.

The choice of the terms "lory" and "lorikeet" is subjective, like the use of "parrot" and "parakeet". Species with longer tapering tails are generally referred to as "lorikeets", while species with short blunt tails are generally referred to as "lories".

== Taxonomy ==
Traditionally, lories and lorikeets have either been classified as the subfamily, Loriinae, or as a family on their own, Loriidae, but they are currently classified as a tribe. Neither traditional view is confirmed by molecular studies. Those studies show that the lories and lorikeets form a single group, closely related to the budgerigar and the fig parrots (Cyclopsitta and Psittaculirostris).

A comprehensive molecular phylogenetic study of the Loriini published in 2020 led to major changes in the generic boundaries. The reorganisation involved the resurrection of four genera: Charminetta, Hypocharmosyna, Charmosynopsis and Glossoptilus, as well as the erection of three entirely new genera: Synorhacma, Charmosynoides and Saudareos. One genus disappeared, as the collared lory, which had previously been placed in the monotypic genus Phigys, was found to be embedded in the genus Vini. The extinct New Caledonian lorikeet, although not sampled, was assumed to be a member of the genus Vini on plumage and biogeographic grounds. The tribe Loriini now contains 61 species divided into 12 genera.

- Loriini
  - Oreopsittacus – Plum-faced lorikeet
  - - - Charminetta – Pygmy lorikeet
      - - Hypocharmosyna – 2 species
        - - Charmosynopsis – 2 species
          - - Charmosyna – 4 species
            - Vini – 12 species
    - - Neopsittacus – 2 species
      - - Lorius – 6 species
        - - Psitteuteles – 3 species
          - - Chalcopsitta – 5 species
            - - Glossoptilus – Goldie's lorikeet
              - Trichoglossus – 22 species

Phylogeny of the Loriini based on a genetic study published in 2020.

=== Genera ===
Image	Genus	Living species
	Oreopsittacus Salvadori, 1877	Plum-faced lorikeet, Oreopsittacus arfaki
	Charminetta Iredale, 1956	Pygmy lorikeet, Charminetta wilhelminae
	Hypocharmosyna Salvadori, 1891	Red-fronted lorikeet, Hypocharmosyna rubronotata; Red-flanked lorikeet, Hypocharmosyna placentis
	Charmosynopsis Salvadori, 1877	Blue-fronted lorikeet, Charmosynopsis toxopei; Fairy lorikeet, Charmosynopsis pulchella
	Charmosyna Wagler, 1832	Striated lorikeet, Charmosyna multistriata; Josephine's lorikeet, Charmosyna josefinae; West Papuan lorikeet, Charmosyna papou; Stella's lorikeet, Charmosyna stellae
	Vini Lesson, R, 1833	Duchess lorikeet, Vini margarethae; Meek's lorikeet, Vini meeki; New Caledonian lorikeet, Vini diadema (possibly extinct); Red-chinned lorikeet, Vini rubrigularis; Palm lorikeet, Vini palmarum; Red-throated lorikeet, Vini amabilis; Collared lory, Vini solitaria; Blue-crowned lorikeet, Vini australis; Ultramarine lorikeet, Vini ultramarina; Stephen's lorikeet, Vini stepheni; Kuhl's lorikeet, Vini kuhlii; Blue lorikeet, Vini peruviana
	Neopsittacus Salvadori, 1875	Yellow-billed lorikeet, Neopsittacus musschenbroekii; Orange-billed lorikeet, Neopsittacus pullicauda
	Lorius Vigors, 1825	White-naped lory, Lorius albidinuchus; Yellow-bibbed lory, Lorius chlorocercus; Purple-naped lory, Lorius domicella; Chattering lory, Lorius garrulus; Purple-bellied lory, Lorius hypoinochrous; Black-capped lory, Lorius lory
	Psitteuteles Bonaparte, 1854	Varied lorikeet, Psitteuteles versicolor; Purple-crowned lorikeet, Psitteuteles porphyrocephalus; Little lorikeet, Psitteuteles pusillus
	Chalcopsitta Bonaparte, 1850	Dusky lory, Chalcopsitta fuscata; Cardinal lory, Chalcopsitta cardinalis; Brown lory, Chalcopsitta duivenbodei; Black lory, Chalcopsitta atra; Yellow-streaked lory, Chalcopsitta scintillata
	Glossoptilus Rothschild and Hartert, 1896	Goldie's lorikeet, Glossoptilus goldiei
	Trichoglossus Stephens, 1826	Musk lorikeet, Trichoglossus concinnus; Mindanao lorikeet, Trichoglossus johnstoniae; Iris lorikeet, Trichoglossus iris; Ornate lorikeet, Trichoglossus ornatus; Yellow-cheeked lorikeet, Trichoglossus meyeri; Sula lorikeet, Trichoglossus flavoviridis; Blue-streaked lory, Trichoglossus reticulatus; Blue-eared lory, Trichoglossus semilarvatus; Red lory, Trichoglossus borneus; Black-winged lory, Trichoglossus cyanogenius; Red-and-blue lory, Trichoglossus histrio; Violet-necked lory, Trichoglossus squamatus; Pohnpei lorikeet, Trichoglossus rubiginosus; Scaly-breasted lorikeet, Trichoglossus chlorolepidotus; Coconut lorikeet, Trichoglossus haematodus; Biak lorikeet, Trichoglossus rosenbergii; Rainbow lorikeet, Trichoglossus moluccanus; Red-collared lorikeet, Trichoglossus rubritorquis; Olive-headed lorikeet, Trichoglossus euteles; Marigold lorikeet, Trichoglossus capistratus; Leaf lorikeet, Trichoglossus weberi; Sunset lorikeet, Trichoglossus forsteni

== Morphology ==
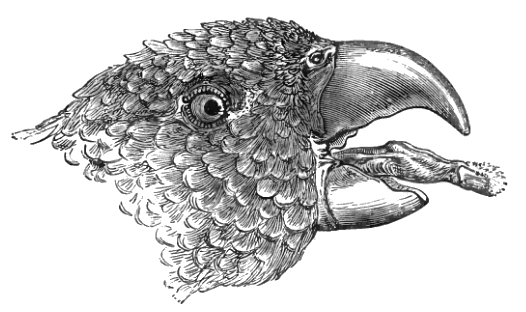
Tongue of a lory

Lories and lorikeets have specialized brush-tipped tongues for feeding on nectar and soft fruits. They can feed from the flowers of about 5,000 species of plants and use their specialized tongues to take the nectar. The tip of their tongues have tufts of papillae (extremely fine hairs), which collect nectar and pollen.

The multi-coloured rainbow lorikeet was one of the species of parrots appearing in the first edition of The Parrots of the World and also in John Gould's lithographs of the Birds of Australia.

== Diet ==
In the wild, rainbow lorikeets feed mainly on pollen and nectar, and possess a tongue adapted especially for their particular diet. Many fruit orchard owners consider them a pest, as they often fly in groups and strip trees containing fresh fruit. They are also frequent visitors at bird feeders that supply lorikeet-friendly treats, such as store-bought nectar, sunflower seeds, and fruits such as apples, grapes and pears. Occasionally they have been observed feeding on meat.

== Conservation ==
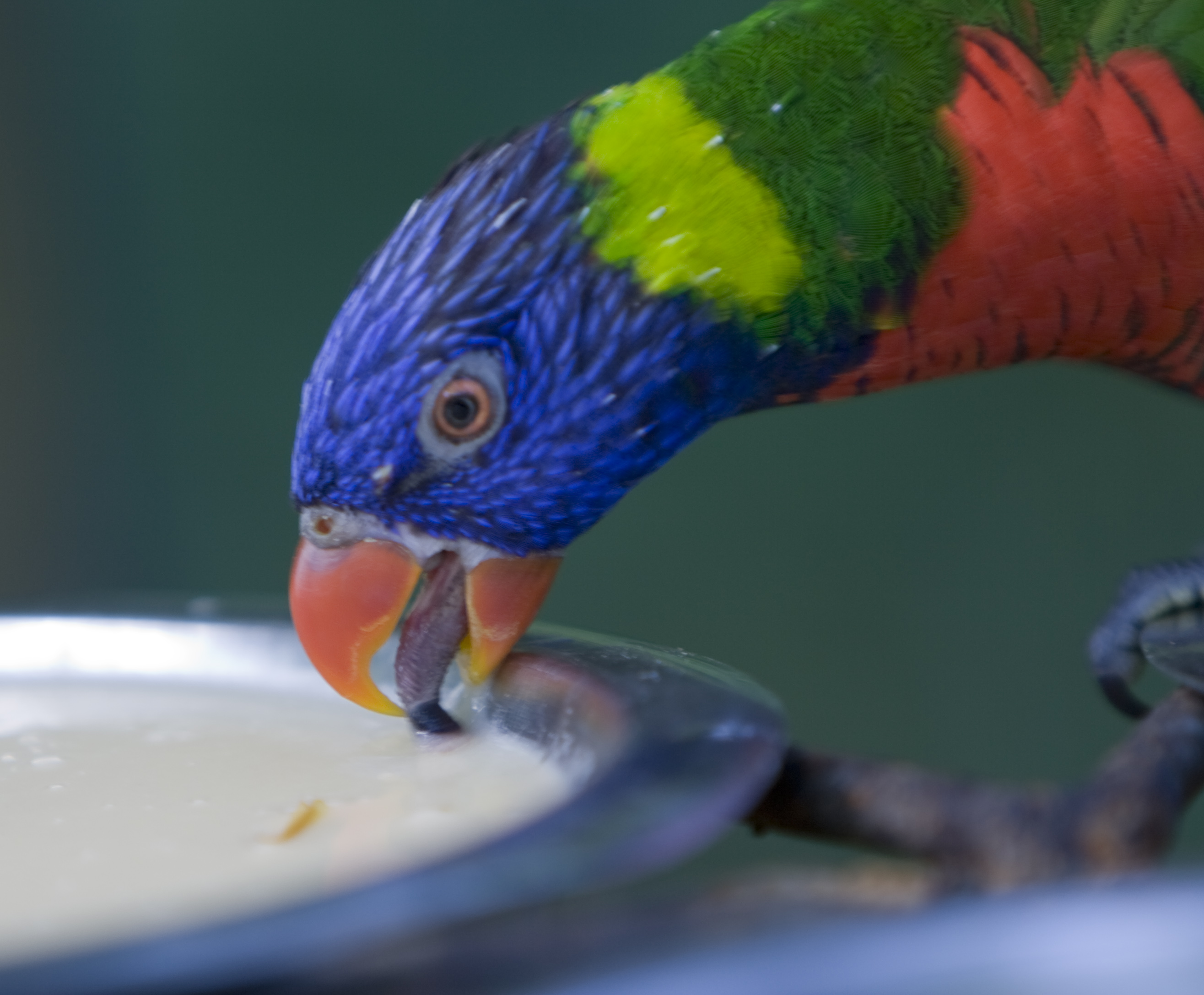
Rainbow lorikeet drinking

The ultramarine lorikeet is endangered. It is now one of the 50 rarest birds in the world. The blue lorikeet is classified as vulnerable. The introduction of European rats to the small island habitats of these birds is a major cause of their endangerment. Various conservation efforts have been made to relocate some of these birds to locations free of predation and habitat destruction.

== In literature ==
A Lory appears in Chapter III of Lewis Carroll's Alice's Adventures in Wonderland. Alice argues with the Lory about its age.

== Gallery ==
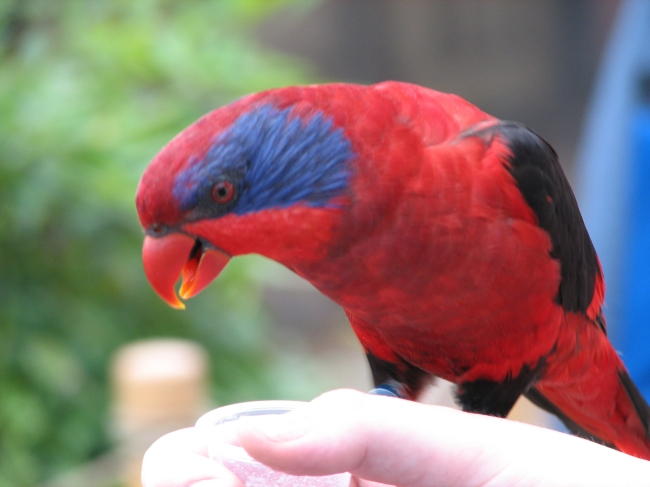
Black-winged lory

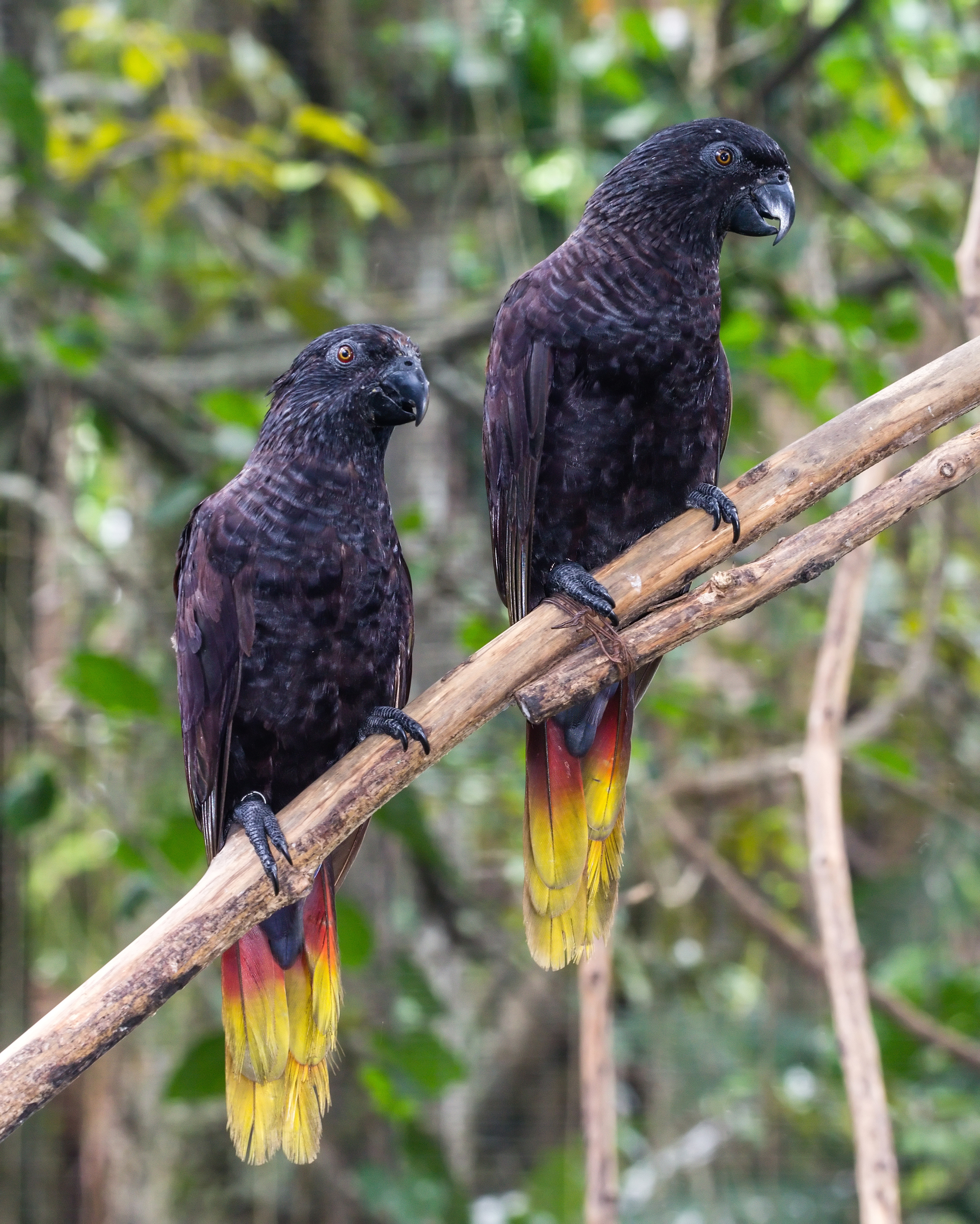
Black lories

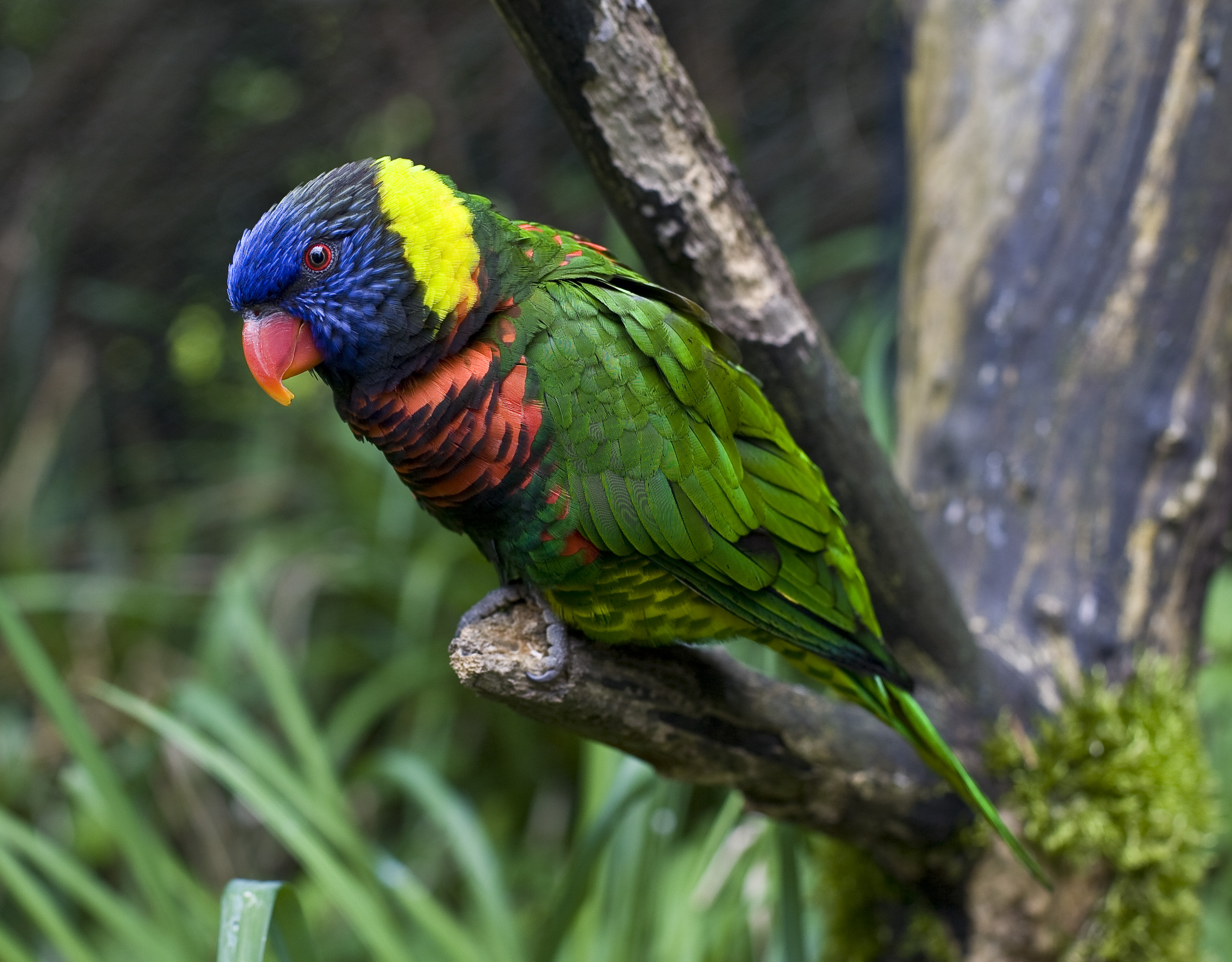
Green-naped lorikeet (subspecies of rainbow lorikeet)

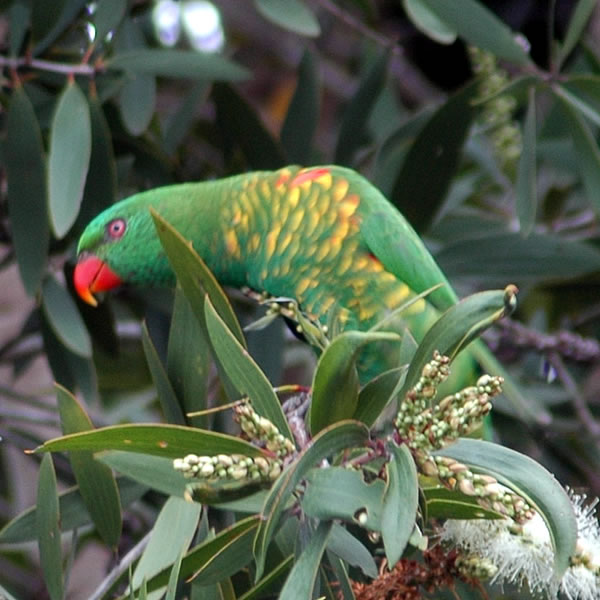
Scaly-breasted lorikeet

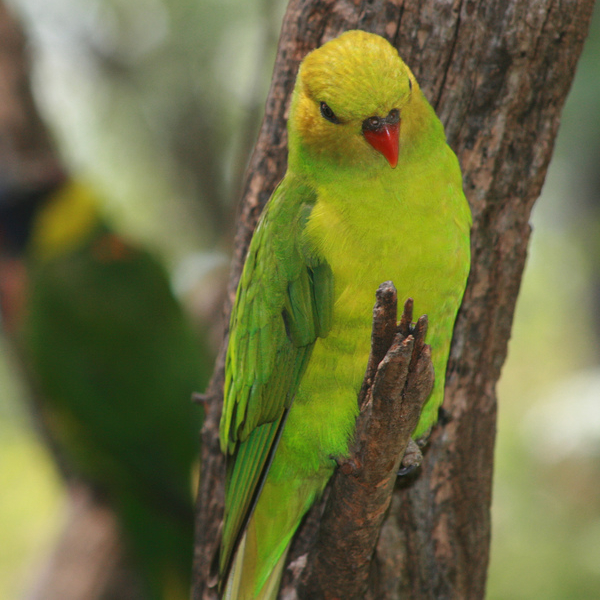
Olive-headed lorikeet

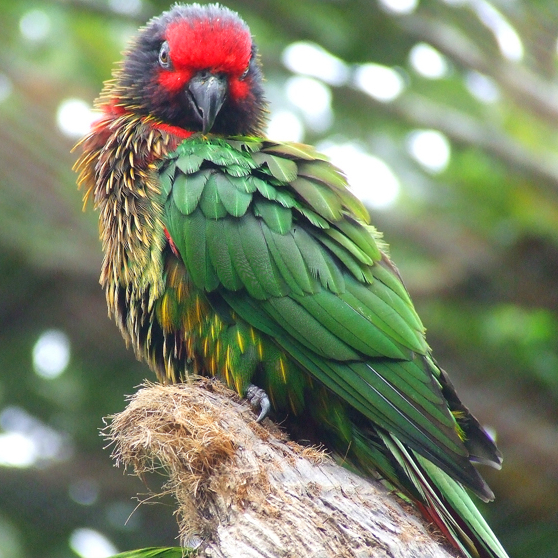
Yellow-streaked lory

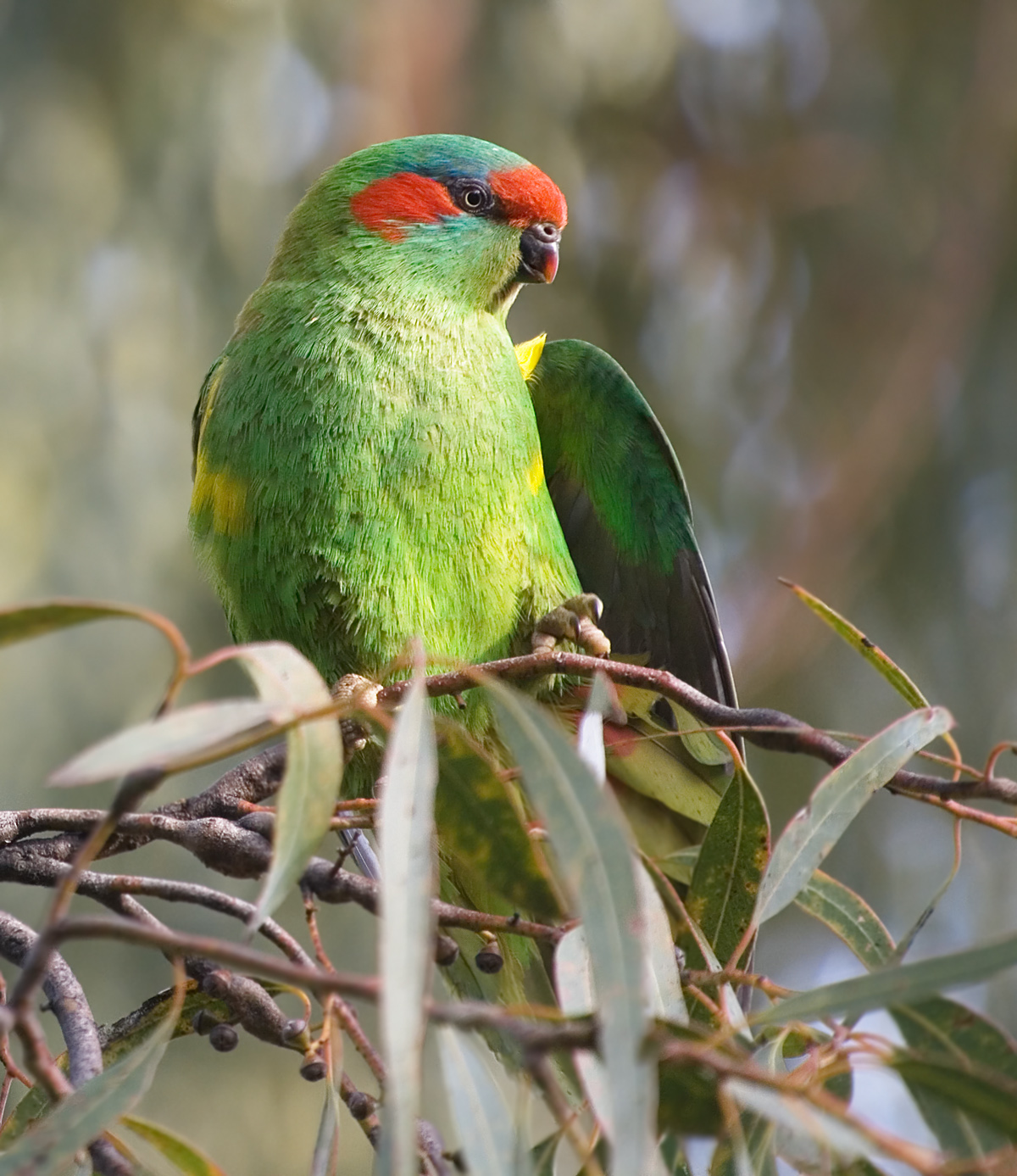
Musk lorikeet

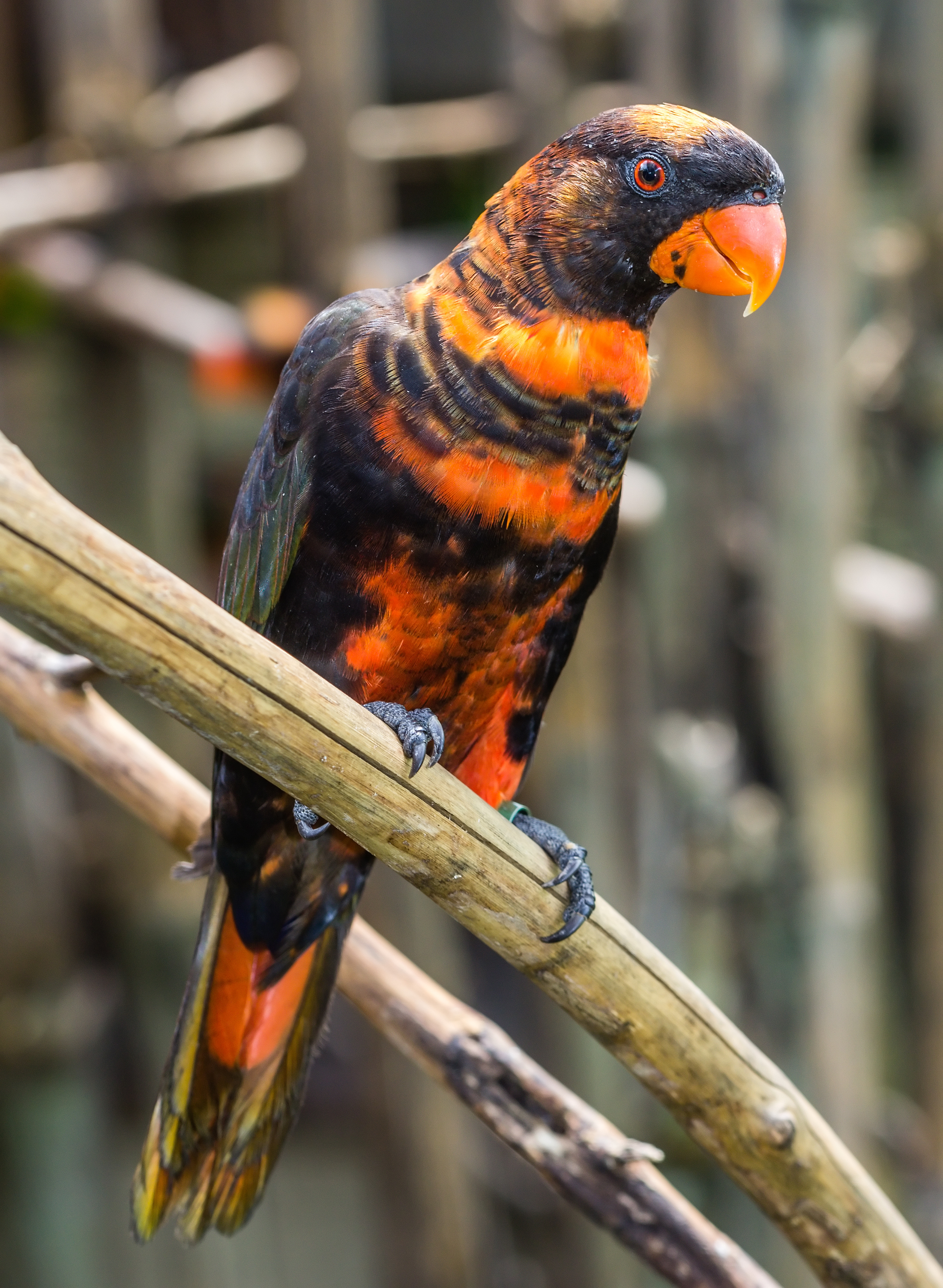
Dusky lory

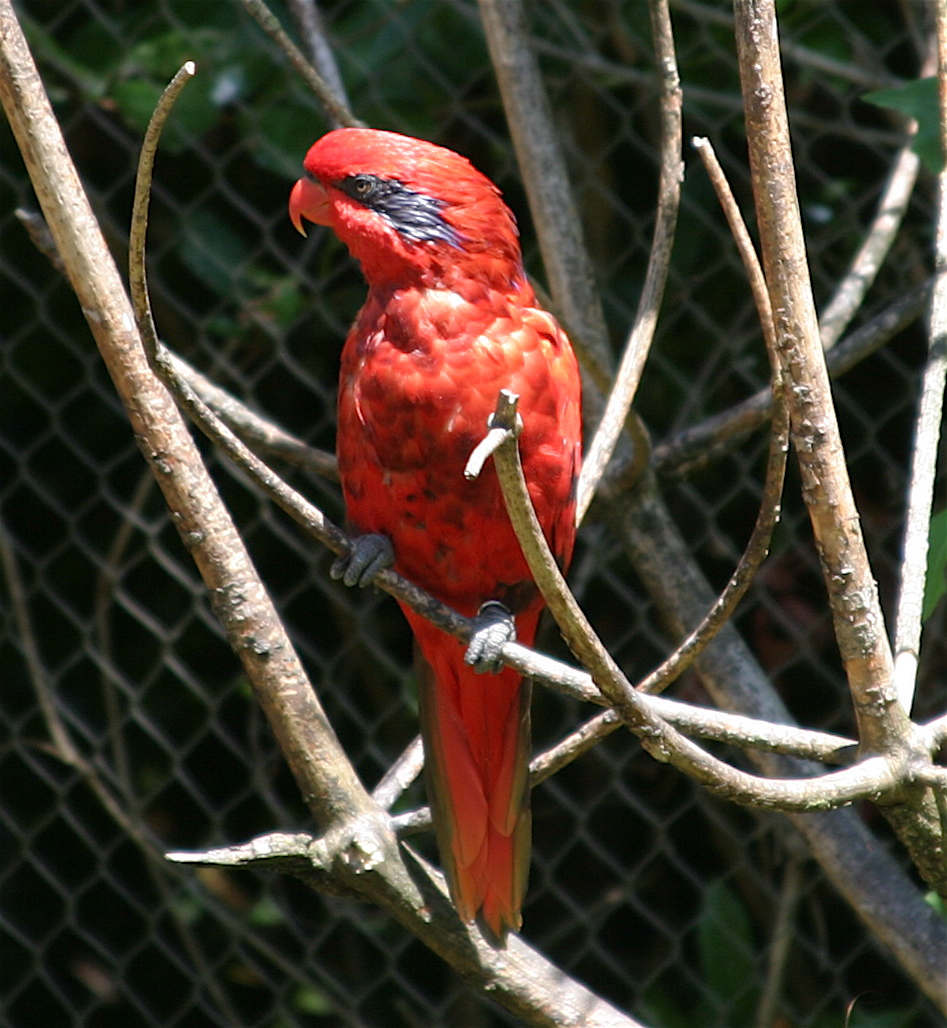
Blue-streaked lory

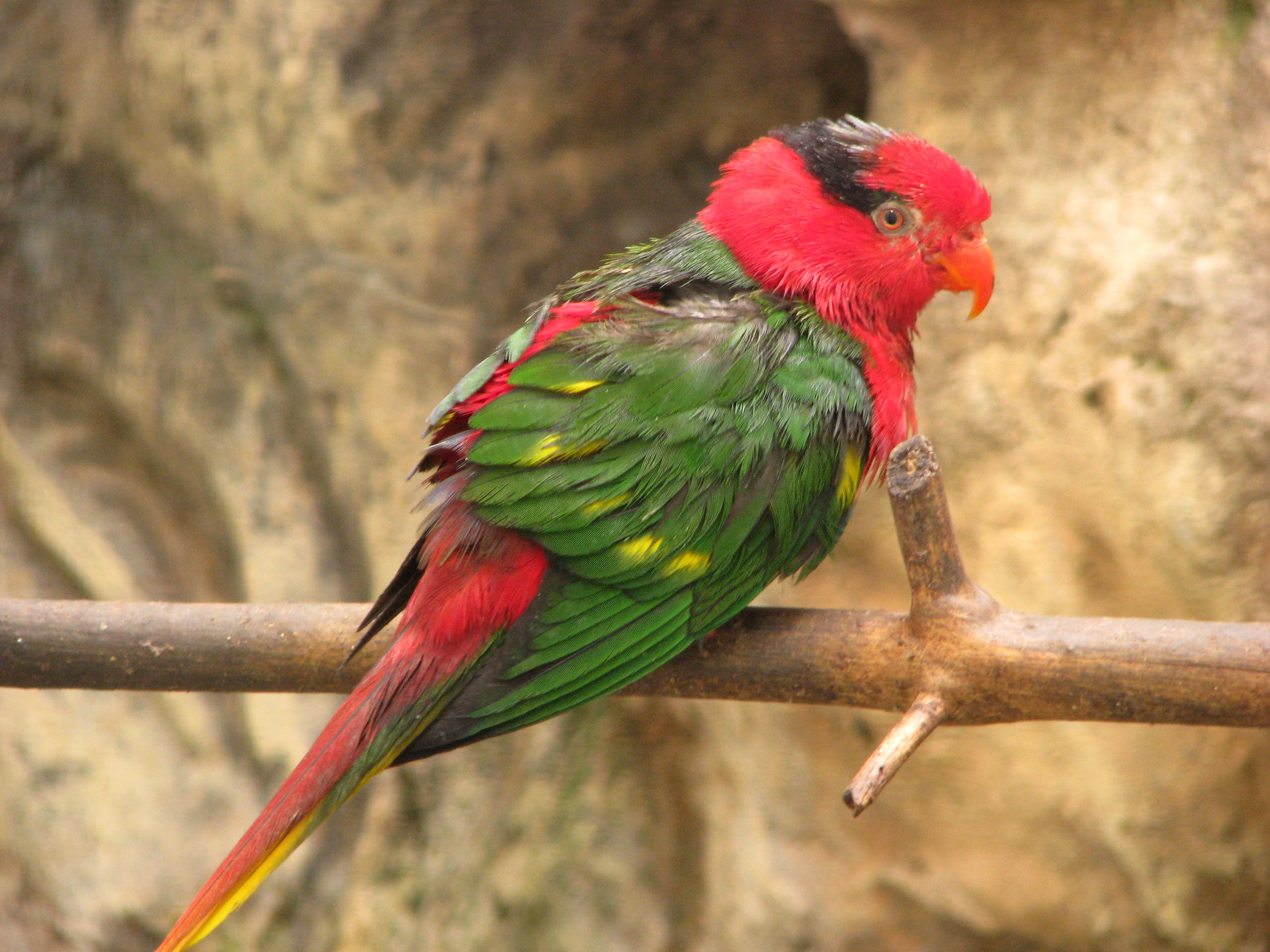
Josephine's lorikeet

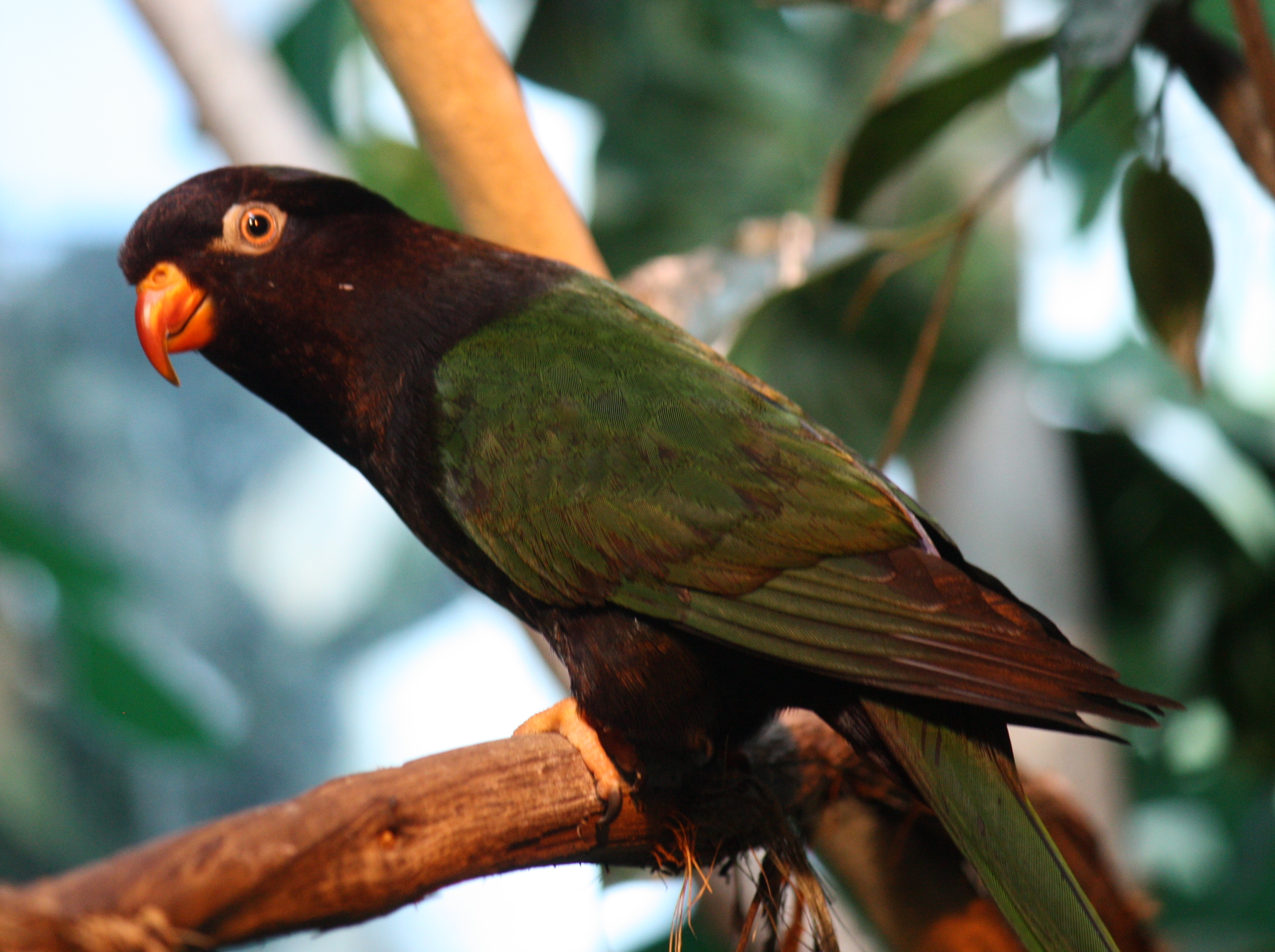
Papuan lorikeet

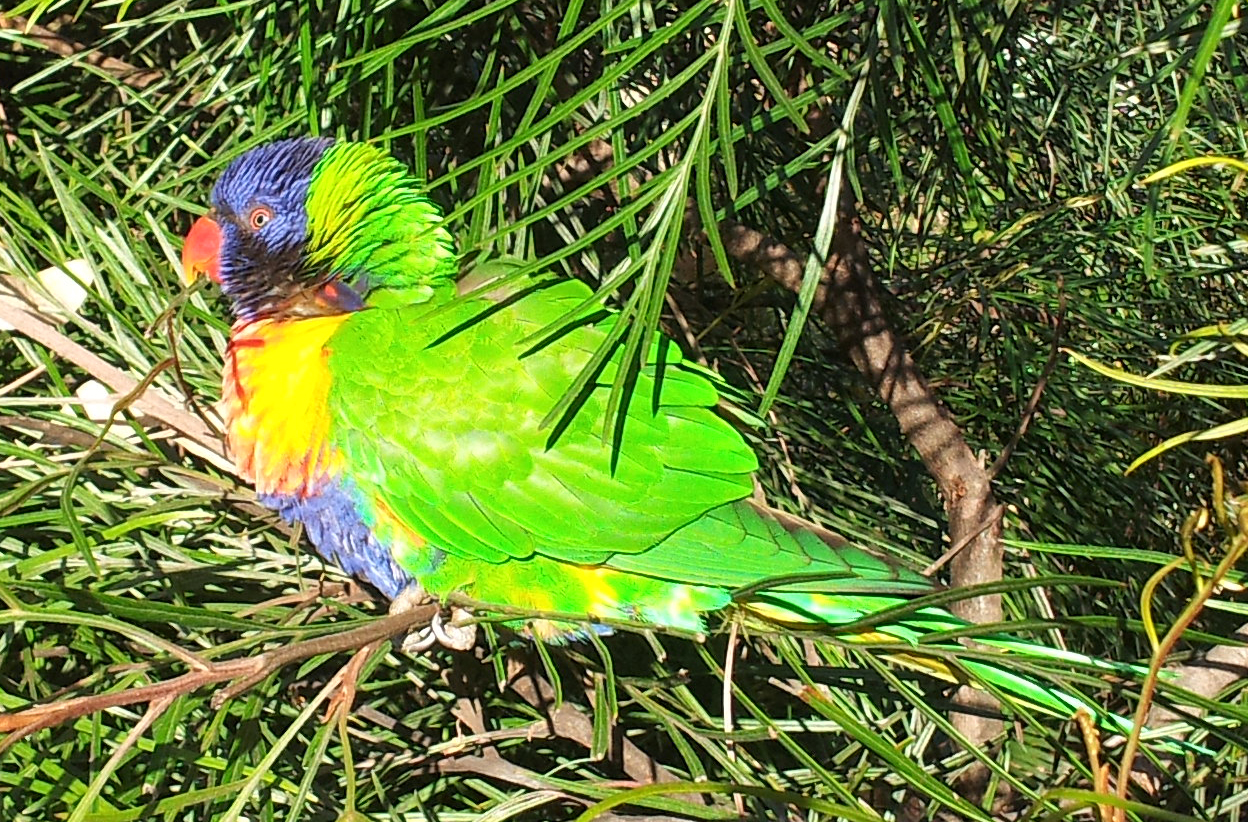
Australian rainbow lorikeet (subspecies of rainbow lorikeet)

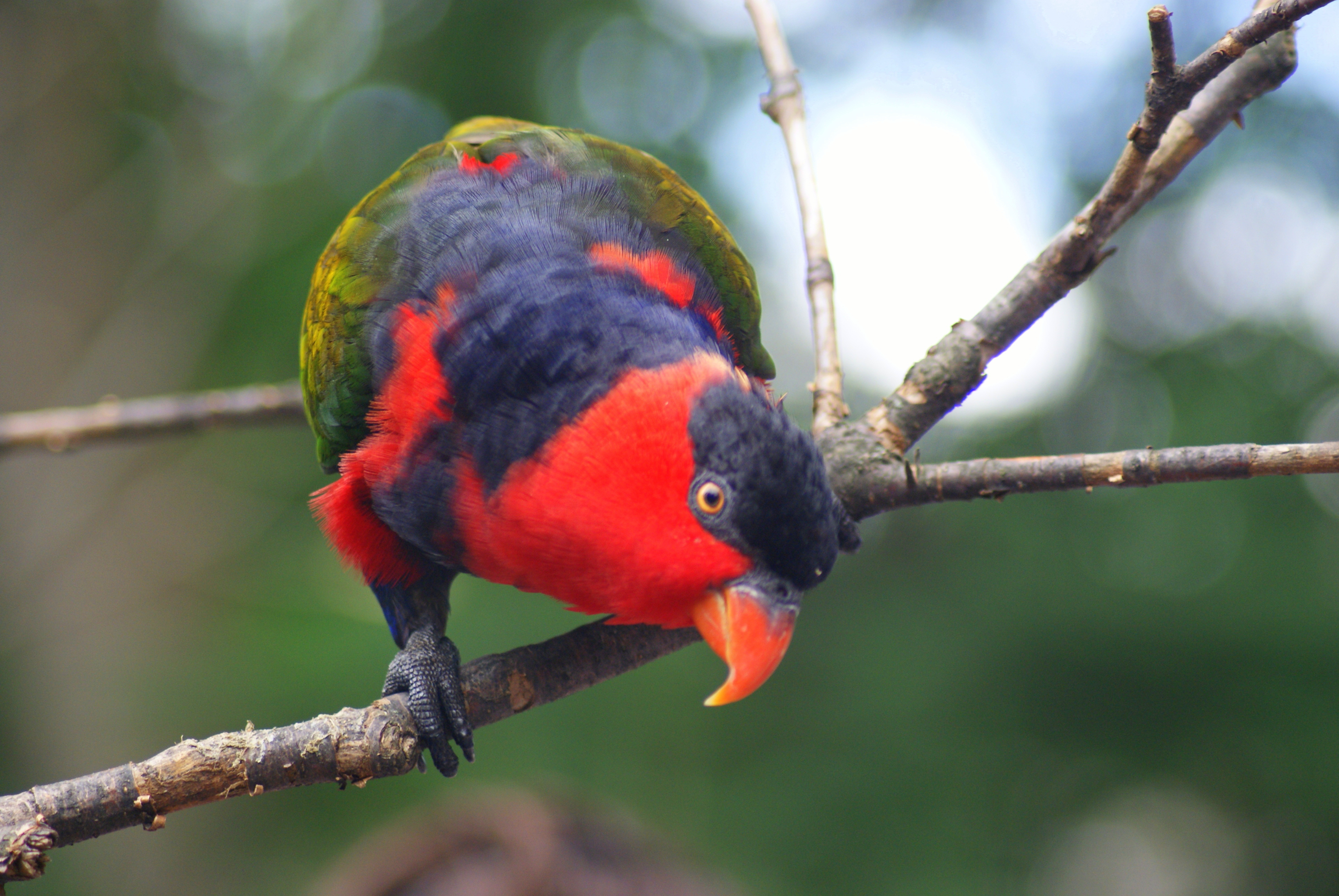
Black-capped lory at the Cincinnati Zoo

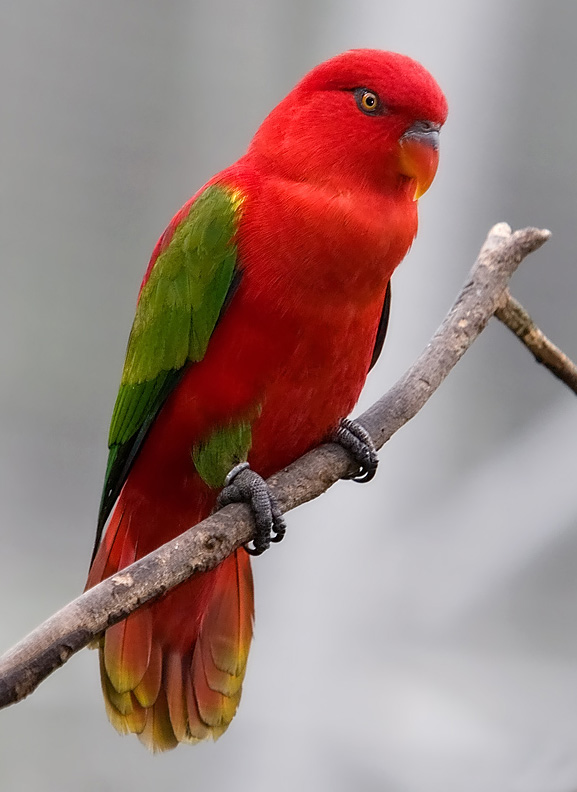
Chattering lory at Jurong Bird Park
