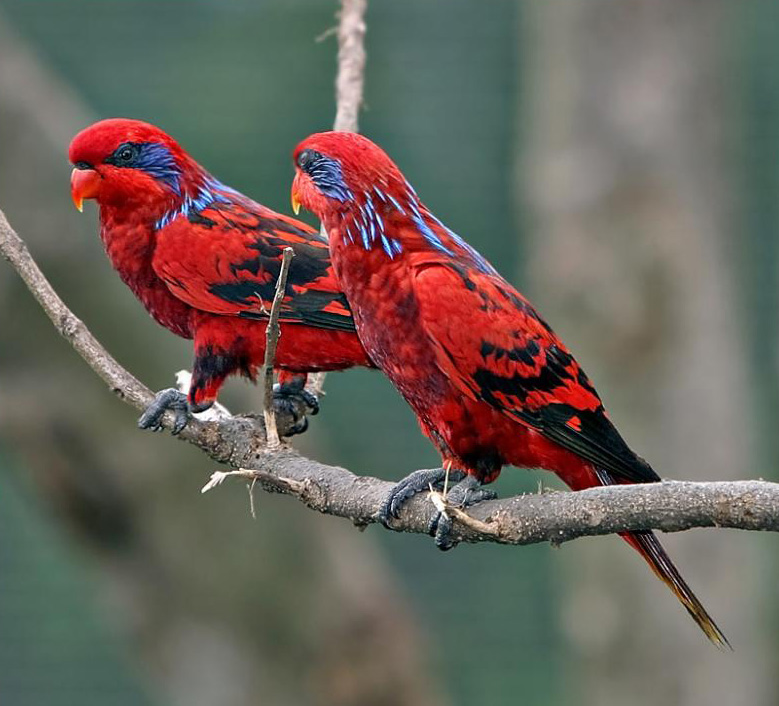
- At Jurong Bird Park, Singapore

Conservation status
- Near Threatened (IUCN 3.1)

Scientific classification
- Kingdom: Animalia
- Phylum: Chordata
- Class: Aves
- Order: Psittaciformes
- Family: Psittaculidae
- Genus: Trichoglossus
- Species: T. reticulatus

Binomial name
- Trichoglossus reticulatus (Müller, S, 1841)

Synonyms
- Eos reticulata

= Blue-streaked lory =

Species of bird

The blue-streaked lory (Trichoglossus reticulatus) is also known as the blue-necked lory. It is a medium-sized parrot (31 cm), which is found on the Tanimbar Islands and Babar in the southern Moluccas.

== Description ==
The blue-streaked lory is about 31 centimetres (12 in) in length, including the tail. They weigh between 145 and 155 grams (5.1 and 5.5 oz).

Adults of both sexes look the same – this is called sexually monomorphic.

Most of the bird's general plumage is bright red. Against this intense red background, there are scattered electric blue feathers near the ears and on the nape of the neck, which is where the bird gets its name. From the area to the base of the neck, there is an indigo-violet stripe. The lower part of the nape of the neck, to the top of the back, is a bluish black. The main part of the back, as well as the rump, is red. Wing coverts and flights are red with black tips. The upper part of the tail feathers are a reddish black, and the underside of the tail is a muted red. The iris of the eye is orange-red. The beak is sharply curved, short, and bright red-orange. The feet are medium gray, and the claws are black.

== Social ecology ==
There are estimated to be between 100,000 and 500,000 blue-streaked lories in the wild.

While their diet in the wild is unknown, it is thought to be similar to that of most lories and lorikeets, with pollen, nectar, fruit, and some insects making up the vast bulk of the ingesta.

These lories are known as one of the louder species, and when kept in captivity, people's neighbors who desire quiet might be disturbed or annoyed by the bird's penetrating voice. The call is described as a shrill series of screeches in succession, or singular screeches.

Social and gregarious, these birds travel in noisy flocks of up to ten individuals when possible.

The bird's lifespan in captivity is reported to be 28–32 years.

The usual clutch of eggs is 2, but in exceptional circumstances, 3 eggs may be laid. In commercial aviculture for breeding, it is very important to set up compatible pairs, to prevent harm to one member of the pair.

Incubation time is 25 days, and from the time of hatching, the time to fledge is approximately 12 weeks.

== Threats ==
Main threats to the bird in the wild are habitat degradation (logging, forest extirpation to plant palms or other monocultures) and trapping for the pet trade.

The birds have a restricted and small range, but because the population is not fragmented, it is not severely threatened.

Both primary, old growth forest and replacement, or secondary, forest are preferred habitats. These parrots will live in mangrove forests as well as on human managed lands such as coconut plantations.

== Legal status ==
The IUCN lists these parrots as Near Threatened. For international trade, this parrot is listed as CITES Appendix II, which means that commercial trade must be done with special permits.

== Relationship with humans ==
The bird is tame and playful when they have been raised by humans in captivity. Wild caught birds, being wild, are shy. The bird readily adapts to life in captivity.

== Taxonomic note ==
There are no subspecies; only the nominate race is recognized.

== Gallery ==
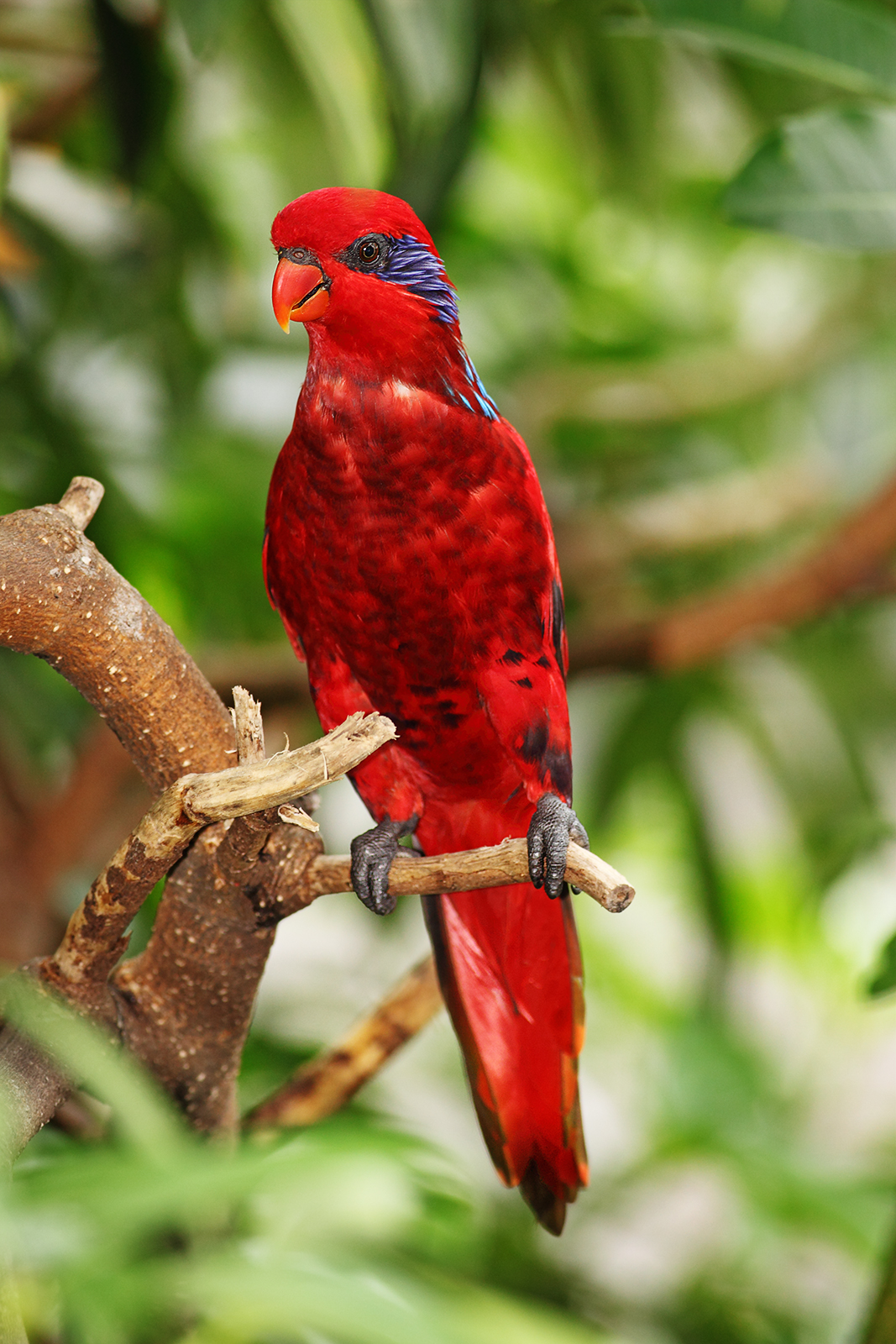
At Jurong Bird Park

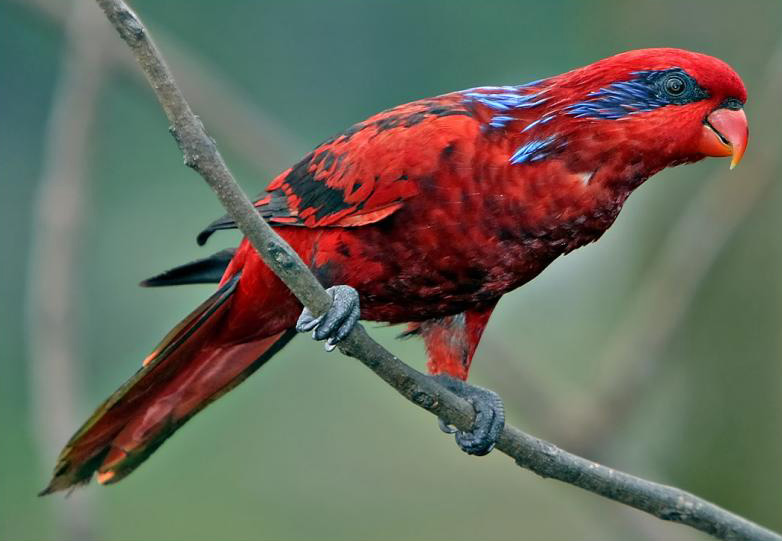

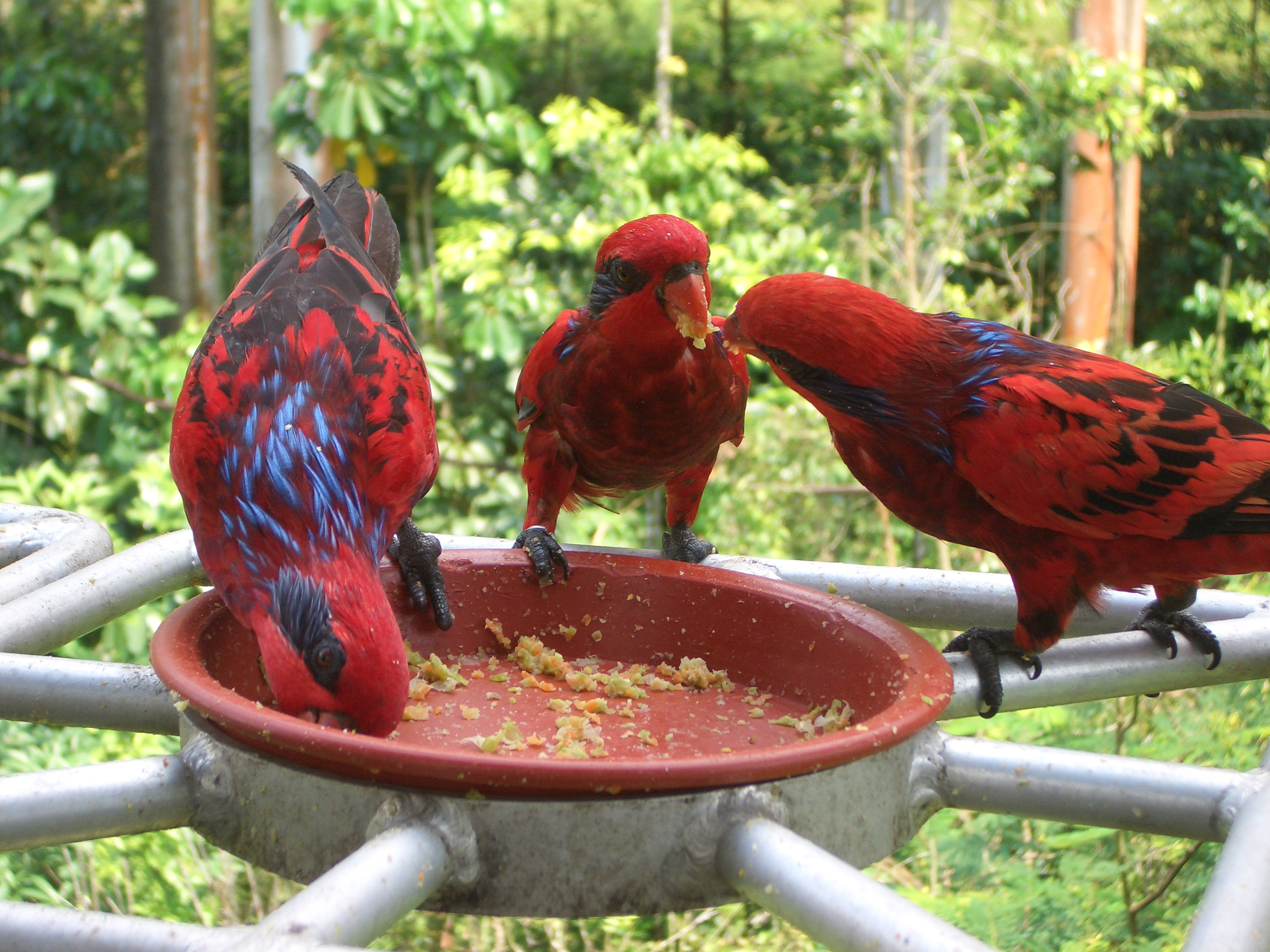
Jurong Bird Park, Singapore

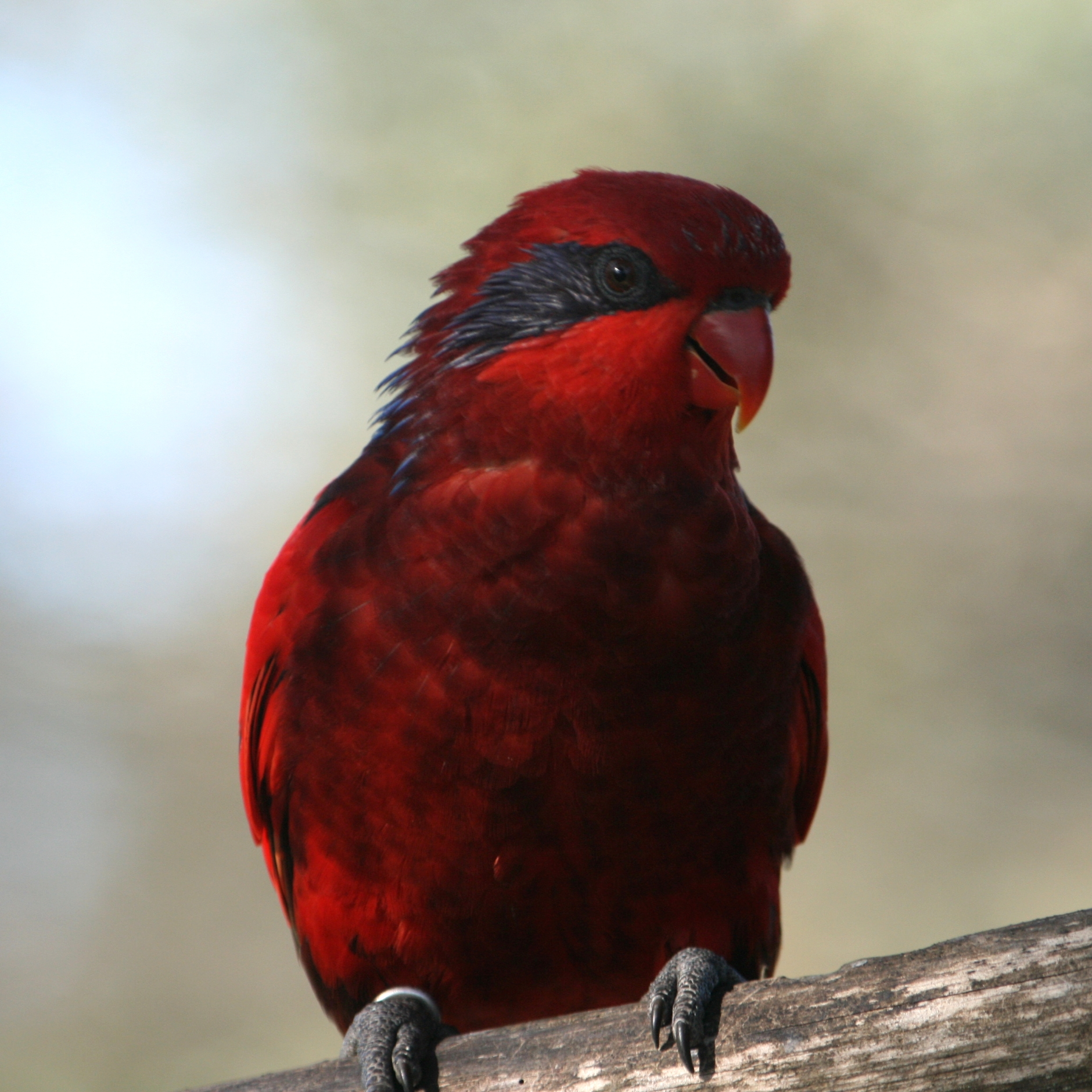
At Safari World Animals, Florida, USA

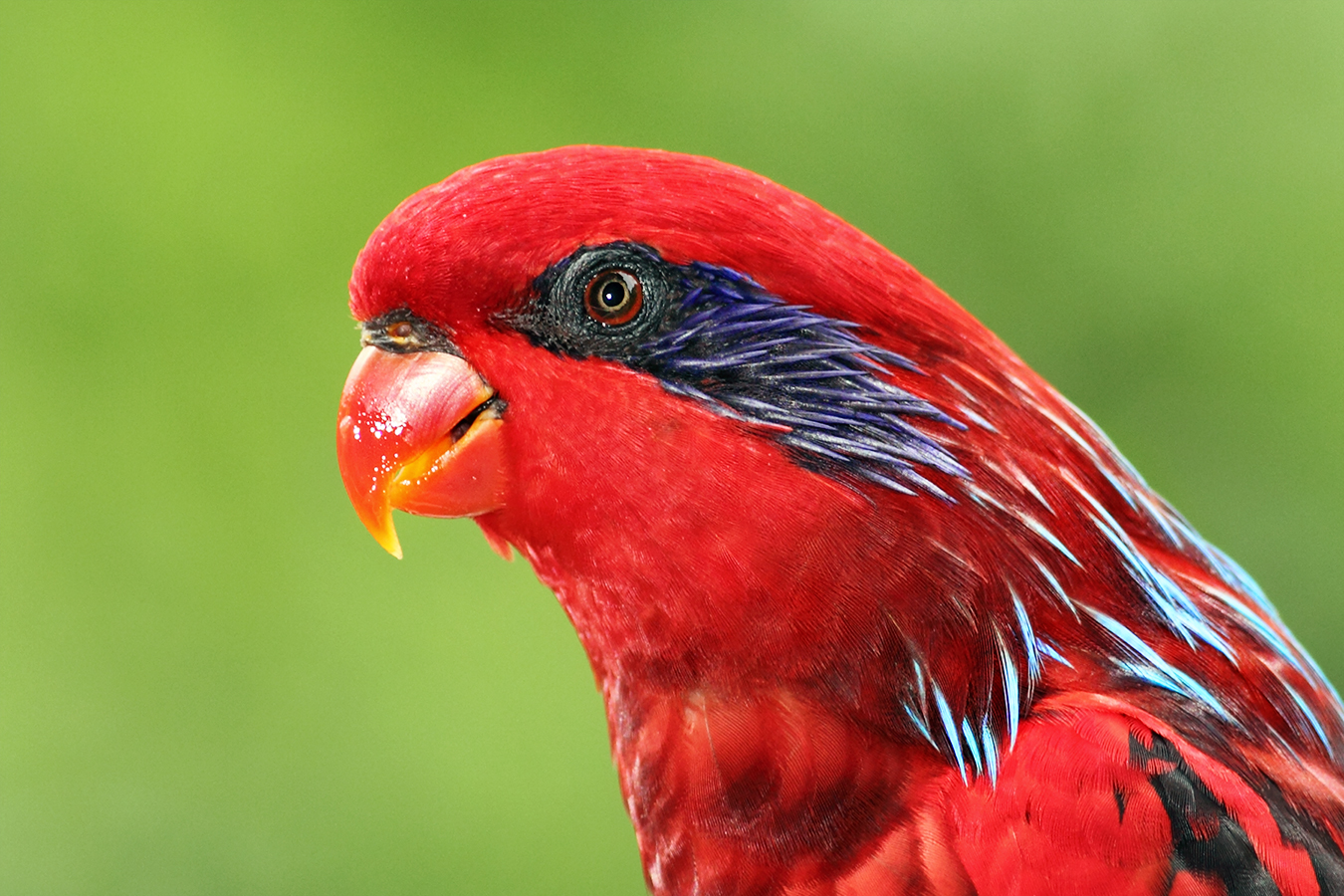
Head detail
