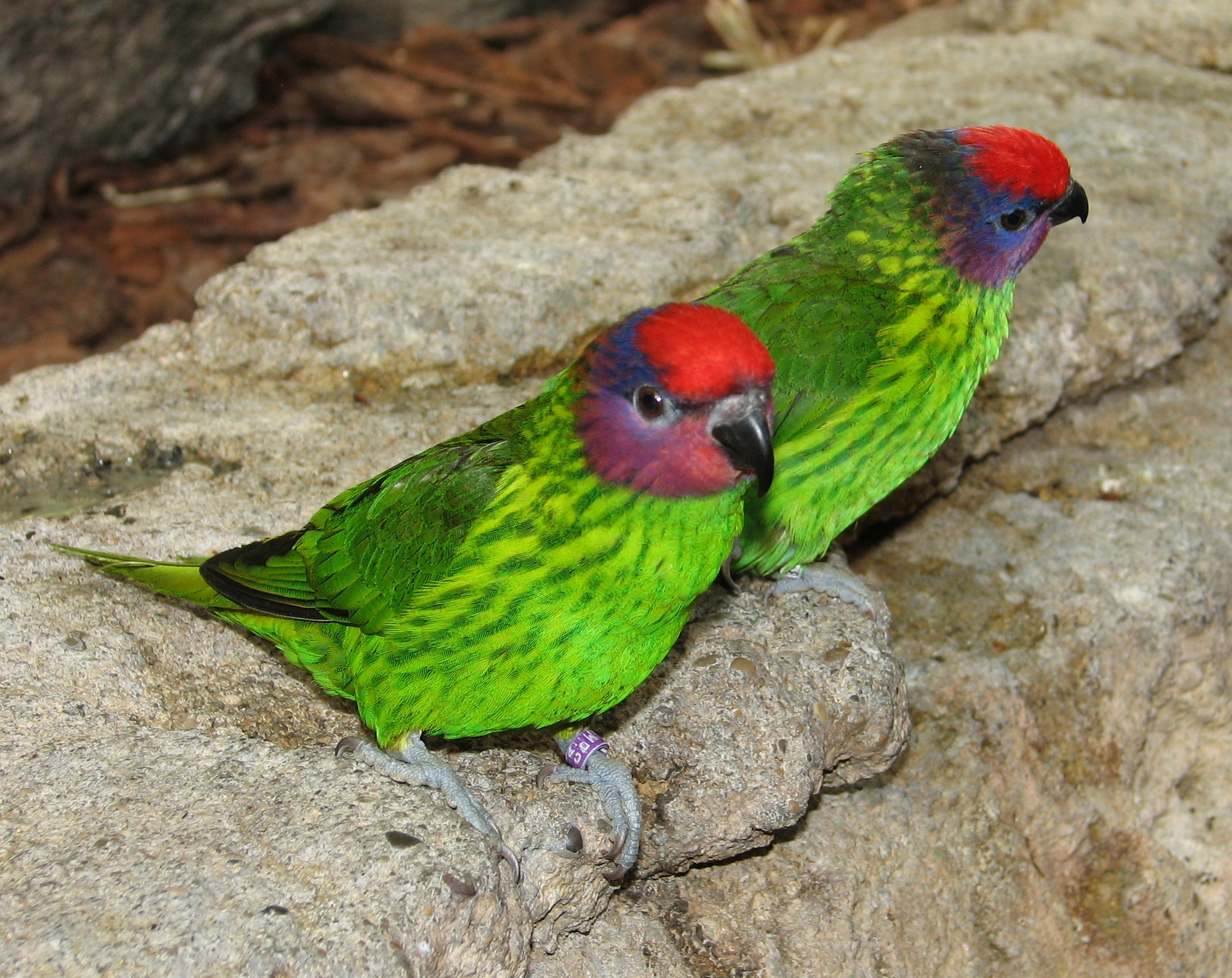
- At Newport Aquarium, Kentucky, USA.

Conservation status
- Least Concern (IUCN 3.1)

Scientific classification
- Kingdom: Animalia
- Phylum: Chordata
- Class: Aves
- Order: Psittaciformes
- Family: Psittaculidae
- Tribe: Loriini
- Genus: Glossoptilus; Hartert, 1896
- Species: G. goldiei

Binomial name
- Glossoptilus goldiei (Sharpe, 1882)

= Goldie's lorikeet =

Species of bird

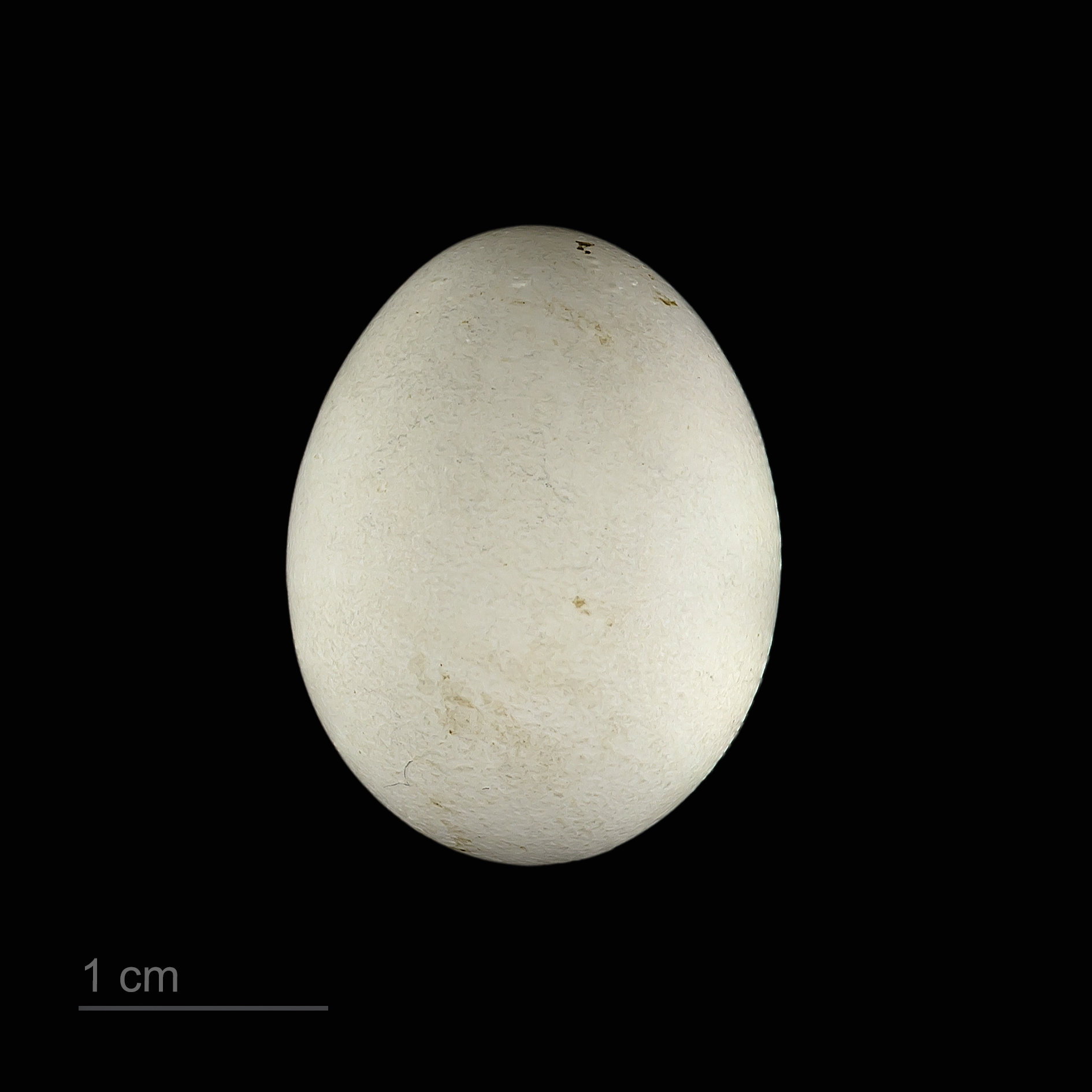
Psitteuteles goldiei – MHNT

Goldie's lorikeet (Glossoptilus goldiei) is a species of parrot in the family Psittaculidae. It is the only species placed in the genus Glossoptilus. It is found in forest and woodland in New Guinea, primarily at altitudes of 1,000–2,200 m (3,280–7,220 ft). It is mostly green with yellowish streaks in the chest area, and a red, blue and purple head. It is a small bird measuring 19 cm (7 1/2 in) in length and weighing 45–60 grams (1.6–2.1 oz).

== Taxonomy ==
Goldie's lorikeet was formally described in 1882 by the English ornithologist Richard Bowdler Sharpe from a specimen collected in New Guinea by Andrew Goldie (1840–1891). Sharpe coined the binomial name Trichoglossus goldiei. Goldie's lorikeet was formerly placed in the genus Psitteuteles but was moved to its own genus Glossoptilus following the publication in 2020 of a phylogenetic study of the lorikeets. The genus Glossoptilus had been introduced in 1896 by Walter Rothschild and Ernst Hartert.

== Description ==
Goldie's lorikeet is 19 cm (7.5 in) long. It is mainly green, and its underside is yellow-green with dark green longitudinal streaks. It has a red plumage on the crown, which is less extensive in the female. The back of its head is blue, its cheeks are mainly mauve and blue, its beak is black, and its irises are brown. Its legs are greenish-brown. In juveniles the red on the head is reduced to a small red patch above its beak. Juveniles have a brown beak, a green crown, and greyish-blue plumage on the back of the head.

== Range ==
Goldie's lorikeet is native to the highlands of New Guinea.

== Aviculture ==
Goldie's lorikeet is well regarded as a pet. They are quiet, non-destructive, non-aggressive, and can be kept as a single pair or in larger communities. Some lorikeets have learned to mimic human voices.

== Cited texts ==
- Forshaw, Joseph M. (2006). Parrots of the World; an Identification Guide. Illustrated by Frank Knight. Princeton University Press. ISBN 0-691-09251-6.
