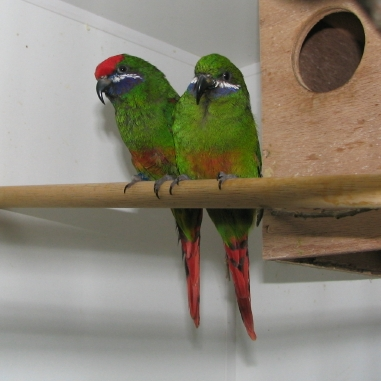
- Male with red crown and female with green crown

Conservation status
- Least Concern (IUCN 3.1)

Scientific classification
- Kingdom: Animalia
- Phylum: Chordata
- Class: Aves
- Order: Psittaciformes
- Family: Psittaculidae
- Tribe: Loriini
- Genus: Oreopsittacus; Salvadori, 1877
- Species: O. arfaki

Binomial name
- Oreopsittacus arfaki (Meyer, 1874)

= Plum-faced lorikeet =

Species of bird

The plum-faced lorikeet (Oreopsittacus arfaki), also known as the whiskered lorikeet, is a species of parrot in the family Psittaculidae. It is monotypic within the genus Oreopsittacus. It is found in the New Guinea Highlands.

== Description ==
The plum-faced lorikeet is a mainly green small parrot about 15 cm (5.9 in) long with a long pointed tail. It has two white stripes under each eye. It has a narrow pointed black bill and dark-brown irises. The adult male has a red forehead and the adult female has a green forehead.

== Taxonomy ==
The plum-faced lorikeet is the only species of the genus Oreopsittacus and it has three subspecies:

Oreopsittacus Salvadori 1877

- Oreopsittacus arfaki (Meyer, AB 1874)
  - Oreopsittacus arfaki arfaki (Meyer, AB 1874) (red-orange abdomen)
  - Oreopsittacus arfaki grandis Ogilvie-Grant 1895 (green abdomen)
  - Oreopsittacus arfaki major Ogilvie-Grant 1914 (red-orange abdomen and larger)

== Range ==
The plum-faced lorikeet's native range is the mountains between about 2000 m to 3750 m of mainland New Guinea across both the Indonesian and Papua New Guinean zones of the island.

== Cited texts ==
- Forshaw, Joseph M. (2006). Parrots of the World; an Identification Guide. Illustrated by Frank Knight. Princeton University Press. ISBN 0-691-09251-6.
