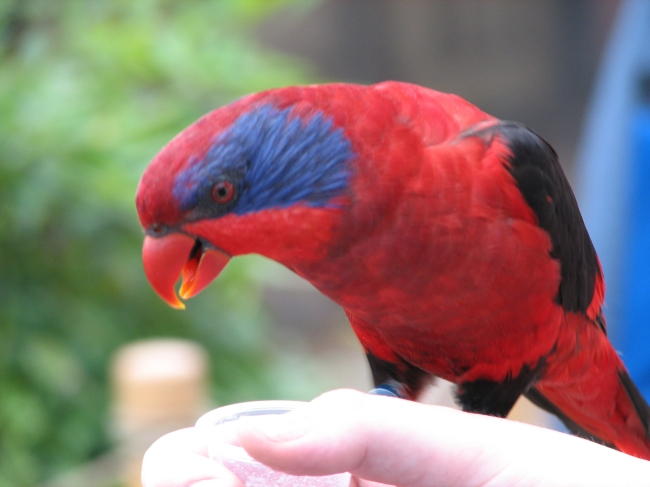

Conservation status
- Near Threatened (IUCN 3.1)

Scientific classification
- Kingdom: Animalia
- Phylum: Chordata
- Class: Aves
- Order: Psittaciformes
- Family: Psittaculidae
- Genus: Trichoglossus
- Species: T. cyanogenius

Binomial name
- Trichoglossus cyanogenius (Bonaparte, 1850)

Synonyms
- Eos cyanogenia

= Black-winged lory =

Species of bird

The black-winged lory (Trichoglossus cyanogenius), also known as the Biak red lory, is a medium-sized, about 30 cm (12 in) long, long-tailed lory. It has a bright red plumage, black shoulder, red iris, an orange red bill and violet ear-patch behind eye. The underwings are red, becoming yellowish with black tips. The sexes are similar.

An Indonesian endemic, the black-winged lory is distributed to forests and coastal habitat of Biak, Numfoor, and Mios Num islands in Cenderawasih Bay, Papua. It frequents and roosts in coconut trees.

Due to ongoing habitat loss, small population size and hunting in some areas, the black-winged lory is evaluated as near threatened on IUCN Red List of Threatened Species. It is listed on Appendix II of CITES.

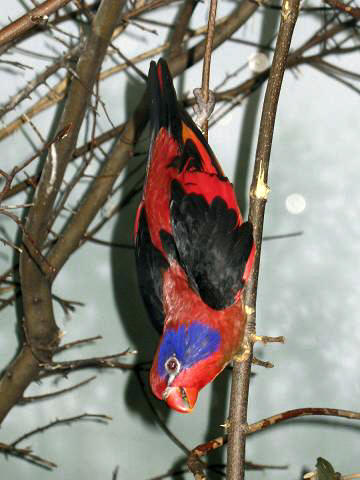
Black-winged lory
