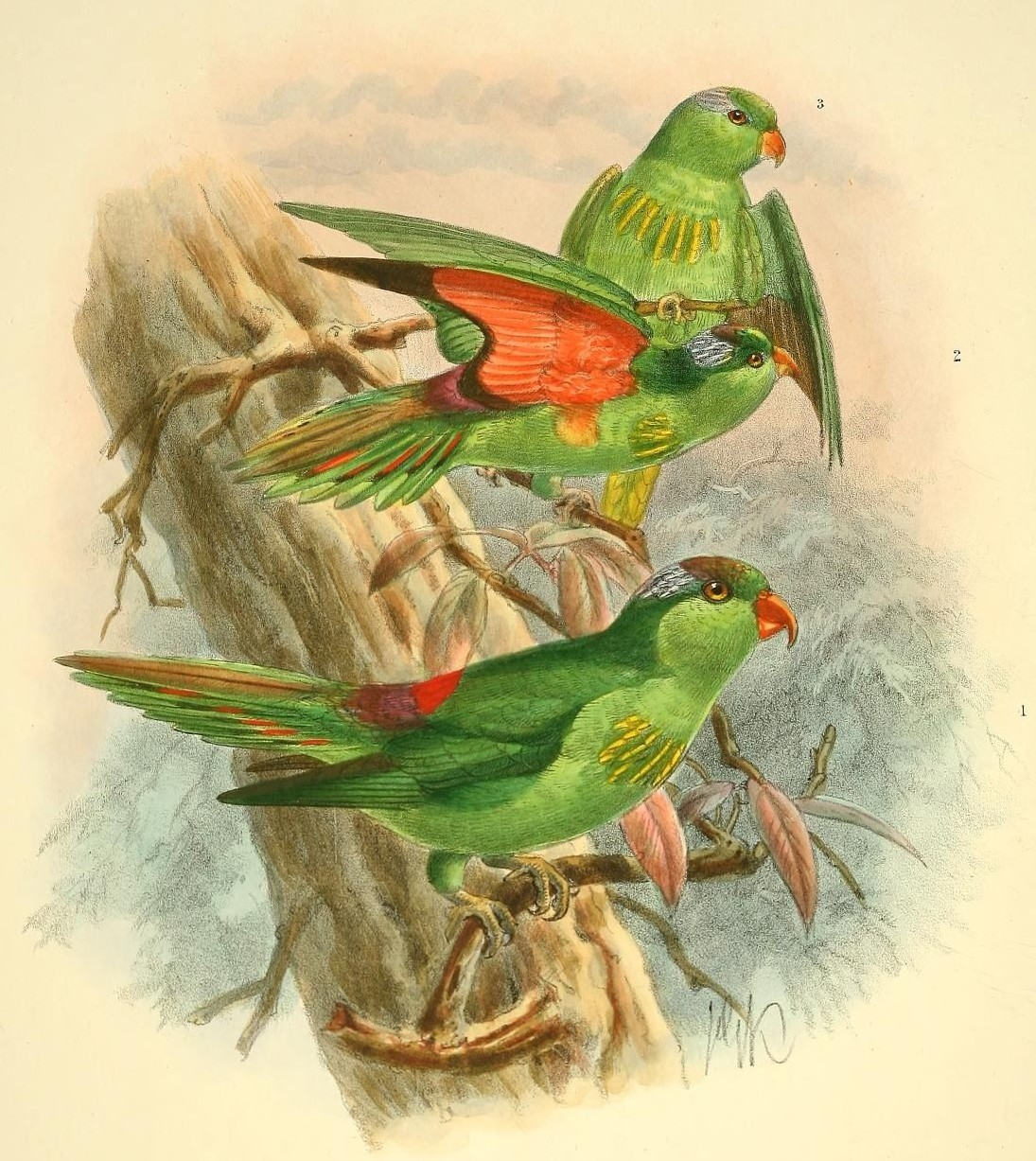

Conservation status
- Least Concern (IUCN 3.1)

Scientific classification
- Kingdom: Animalia
- Phylum: Chordata
- Class: Aves
- Order: Psittaciformes
- Family: Psittaculidae
- Tribe: Loriini
- Genus: Charminetta; Iredale, 1956
- Species: C. wilhelminae

Binomial name
- Charminetta wilhelminae (Meyer, 1874)

= Pygmy lorikeet =

Species of bird

The pygmy lorikeet (Charminetta wilhelminae) is a species of parrot in the family Psittaculidae. It is the only species placed in the genus Charminetta. It is found in the highlands of New Guinea; its natural habitat is subtropical or tropical moist montane forests. The world population of pygmy lorikeets is thought to be less than 50,000 individuals, but stable. They live at altitudes of 1000–2200m.

== Taxonomy ==
The pygmy lorikeet was previously placed in the genus Charmosyna. It was moved to its own genus Charminetta based on phylogenetic studies published in 2020.

== Description ==
The pygmy lorikeet averages 13 cm (5.1 in) in length (including tail) and 20 g (0.71 oz) in mass. It is the smallest of the lorikeets. The male has a dark purple rump and a streaked yellow breast, with red stripes under its wings. His tail is green tipped with yellow, and his eyes and beak are orange. The female lacks the red underwing stripe of the male, and has a green (rather than purple) rump. Immature birds are similar to adults in appearance but lack yellow streaking on their breasts and have brown bills and eyes.

== Behaviour ==
They have high pitched, coarse, relatively weak flight calls. Pairs make quiet contact calls.
