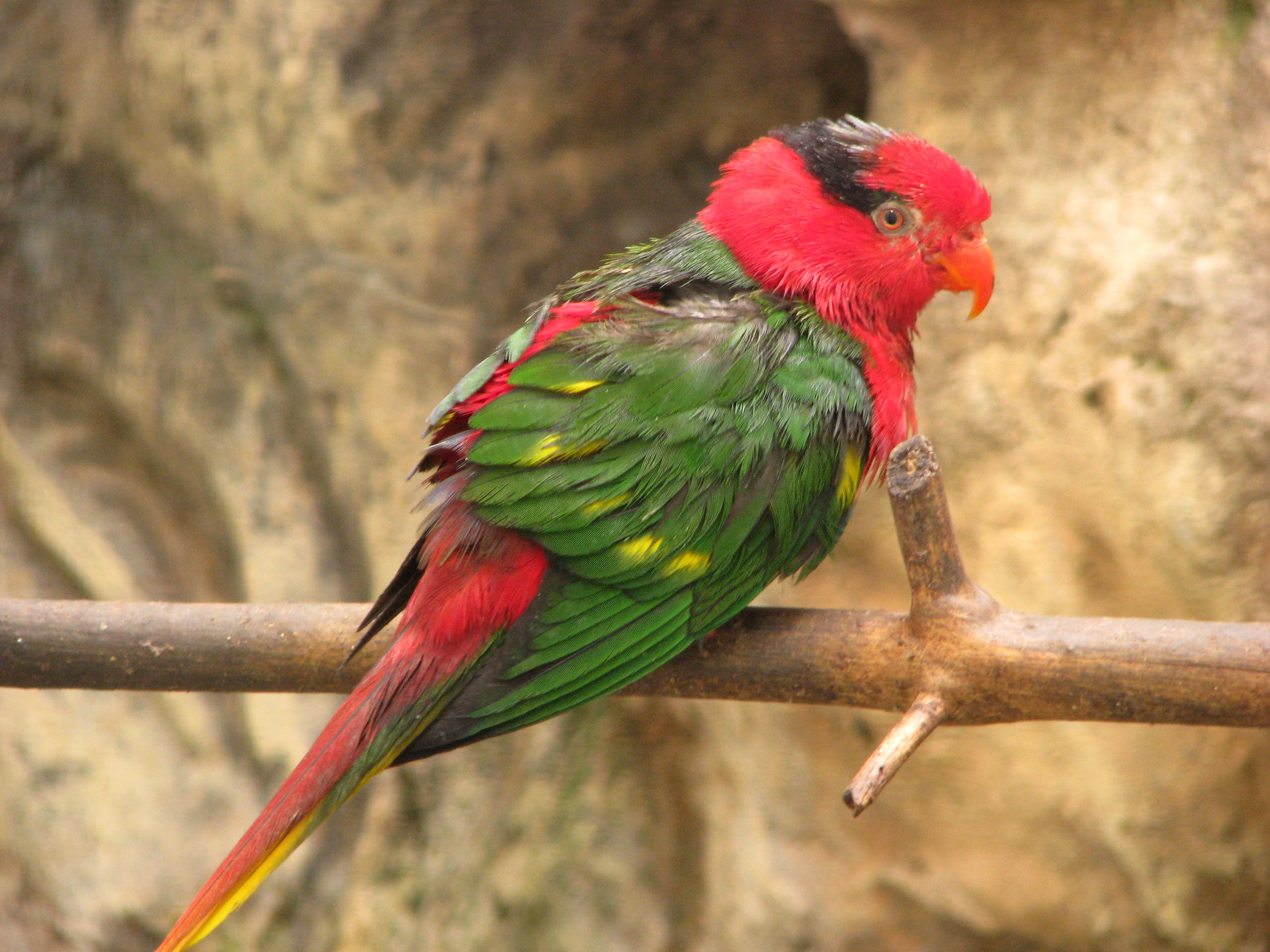
- At Loro Parque (Tenerife, Spain)

Conservation status
- Least Concern (IUCN 3.1)

Scientific classification
- Kingdom: Animalia
- Phylum: Chordata
- Class: Aves
- Order: Psittaciformes
- Family: Psittaculidae
- Genus: Charmosyna
- Species: C. josefinae

Binomial name
- Charmosyna josefinae (Finsch, 1873)

= Josephine's lorikeet =

Species of bird

Josephine's lorikeet (Charmosyna josefinae) is a species of parrot in the family Psittaculidae. It is found in the highlands of New Guinea (central range and Cyclops Mountains). Its natural habitats are subtropical or tropical moist lowland forest and subtropical or tropical moist montane forest.

== Description ==
Josephine's lorikeet is red with green wings, a yellow-tipped tail, dusky blue, orange bill, yellow eyes, and black flanks.

== Diet ==
It feeds on nectar, pollen, flower buds, and sometimes soft fruits.
