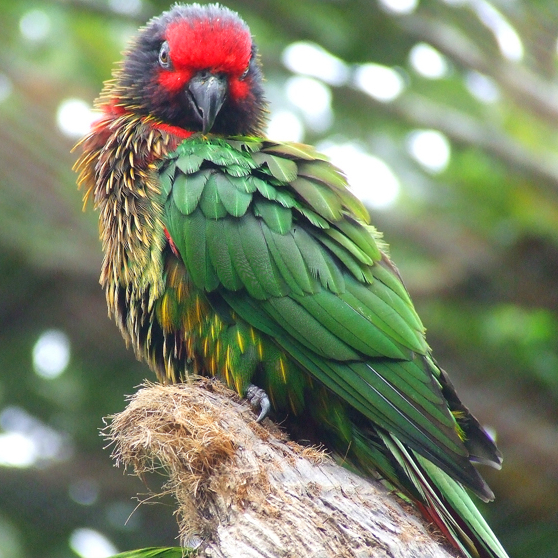

Conservation status
- Least Concern (IUCN 3.1)

Scientific classification
- Kingdom: Animalia
- Phylum: Chordata
- Class: Aves
- Order: Psittaciformes
- Family: Psittaculidae
- Genus: Chalcopsitta
- Species: C. scintillata

Binomial name
- Chalcopsitta scintillata (Temminck, 1835)

= Yellow-streaked lory =

Species of bird

The yellow-streaked lory (Chalcopsitta scintillata), also known as the streaked lory or yellowish-streaked lory, is a species of parrot in the family Psittaculidae.

== Distribution and habitat ==
It is found in the Aru Islands and southern New Guinea. Its natural habitats are subtropical or tropical moist lowland forest and subtropical or tropical mangrove forest.

== Taxonomy ==
The yellow-streaked lory species contains three subspecies:

- Chalcopsitta scintillata (Temminck) 1835
  - Chalcopsitta scintillata chloroptera Salvadori 1876
  - Chalcopsitta scintillata rubrifrons Gray, GR 1858 - Carmine-fronted lory
  - Chalcopsitta scintillata scintillata (Temminck) 1835 - Nominate subspecies
