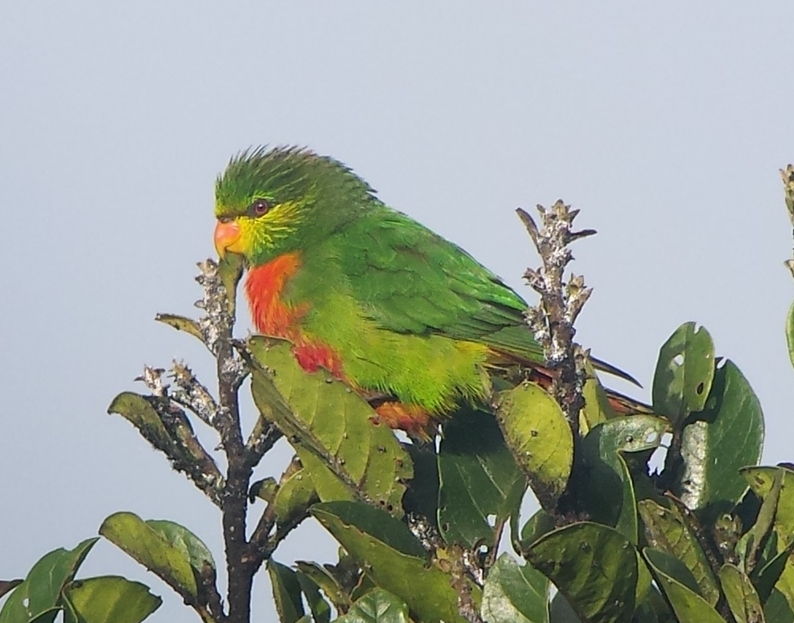

Conservation status
- Least Concern (IUCN 3.1)

Scientific classification
- Kingdom: Animalia
- Phylum: Chordata
- Class: Aves
- Order: Psittaciformes
- Family: Psittaculidae
- Genus: Neopsittacus
- Species: N. pullicauda

Binomial name
- Neopsittacus pullicauda Hartert, 1896

Synonyms
- Neopsittacus muschenbrocki alpinus Ogilvie-Grant, 1914; Neopsittacus pullicauda socialis Mayr, 1931

= Orange-billed lorikeet =

Species of bird

The orange-billed lorikeet (Neopsittacus pullicauda) is a species in the Old World parrot family Psittaculidae. First described by the German ornithologist Ernst Hartert in 1896, it is endemic to New Guinea, where it mainly inhabits cloud forest, forest edges, and cleared areas bordering forests at elevations of 2,100–3,800 m (6,900–12,500 ft). Adults are 18 cm (7.1 in) long on average and weigh 25–40 g (0.88–1.41 oz), and are mainly green in color, with a red underside and narrow yellow streaking on the cheeks. It looks similar to the closely related yellow-billed lorikeet, but is smaller in size, has more richly coloured plumage, and has a smaller, orange bill.

The species feeds on pollen, nectar, flowers, fruits, and, uncommonly, seeds. They sometimes forage together with yellow-billed lorikeets at fruiting trees, but are rarely found with species of other genera. Breeding takes place in October; nests are made in holes in tall trees and contain two eggs. It is listed as being of least concern on the IUCN Red List due to its large range and lack of severe declines in its population.

== Taxonomy and systematics ==
The orange-billed lorikeet was formally described as a species by the German ornithologist Ernst Hartert in 1896 based on specimens from the "Victoria district" in the Owen Stanley Range in New Guinea. The generic name Neopsittacus is from the Greek νεος (neos), meaning new, and ψιττακος (psittakos), meaning parrot. The specific epithet pullicauda is from the Latin pullus, meaning dark-colored, and cauda, meaning tail. Alternative common names for the species include emerald lorikeet, alpine lorikeet and orange-billed mountain lorikeet.

The species shows clinal variation (gradual variation in its appearance along its range), with birds from western populations being smaller and paler than birds from southeastern ones. It is treated as having one subspecies by the International Ornithologists' Union; however, some authorities recognize as many as three subspecies on the basis of differences in appearance, with populations from central western New Guinea separated as N. p. alpinus (Note: Said to have an orange breast, compared to the nominate subspecies's red one, and a darker red belly.) and populations from northeastern New Guinea separated as N. p. socialis. (Note: Said to be darker overall than the nominate subspecies.)

The orange-billed lorikeet is one of two species in the genus Neopsittacus. It and the yellow-billed lorikeet are basal within a clade (group of organisms descending from a common ancestor) formed by Neopsittacus, Lorius, Psitteuteles, Parvipsitta, Pseudeos, Chalcopsitta, Glossoptilus, Glossopsitta, Saudareos, Eos, and Trichoglossus.

- Loriini
  - Plum-faced lorikeet
  - - - Pygmy lorikeet
      - - Hypocharmosyna – 2 species
        - - Charmosynopsis – 2 species
          - - - Striated lorikeet
              - Charmosyna – 3 species
            - - Duchess lorikeet
              - Vini – 11 species
    - - - Yellow-billed lorikeet
        - Orange-billed lorikeet
      - - Lorius – 6 species
        - - - Varied lorikeet
            - Parvipsitta – 2 species
          - - - Pseudeos – 2 species
              - Chalcopsitta – 3 species
            - - Goldie's lorikeet
              - - Musk lorikeet
                - - - Saudareos – 5 species
                    - Eos – 6 species
                  - Trichoglossus – 10 species

Relationships of Neopsittacus to related genera based on a genetic study published in 2023.

== Description ==
The orange-billed lorikeet is a small species of lorikeet, with a length of around 18 cm (7.1 in) and a weight of 25–40 g (0.88–1.41 oz). Adults are mainly dark emerald green, with red underparts and narrow yellow streaking on the cheeks. The flanks and wings are also emerald green; the underside of the tail is a duller green, with a red patch at the base. The underwing is bright red and is especially prominent in flight. The iris and beak are orange, with a yellow tip to the latter, and the feet are dark grey. Immatures are duller in color, with less red on their underparts and an orangish-brown bill. Fledglings have yellow beaks, which turn orange at around 6 months of age.

Other than the yellow-billed lorikeet, no other parrot in the species' range has a similar coloration. Compared with the yellow-billed lorikeet, it is smaller in size, has more richly coloured plumage, and has a smaller, orange bill. Additionally, it can also be distinguished by its flanks and wings being the same shade of green, the underside of the tail being dull green with red at the base, and the lack of an olive tint to the top of its head.

=== Vocalisations ===
The species is very vocal and gives a variety of calls, including a high upslurred "tseet" and other, longer high-pitched calls. Although these calls are similar to those of the yellow-billed lorikeet, they tend to be softer, more high-pitched, and more musical.

== Distribution and habitat ==
The orange-billed lorikeet is endemic to the island of New Guinea. It inhabits forest canopy, forest edges, and cleared areas bordering forests at high elevations in mountains in the Central Range and the Huon Peninsula, but is absent from the Bird's Head Peninsula. It prefers cloud forest at elevations of 2,100–3,800 m (6,900–12,500 ft), but has been recorded at elevations as low as 800 m (2,600 ft). Vagrancy at lower elevations suggests that the species may sporadically migrate altitudinally; Neopsittacus is one of only five genera in the order Psittaciformes to evolve to be nomadic. At lower elevations, it often inhabits the same areas as the yellow-billed lorikeet.

== Behaviour and ecology ==
Orange-billed lorikeets are typically found in small flocks. They feed on pollen, nectar, flowers, fruits, and, uncommonly, seeds. Plants it is known to feed upon include the seed cones of Papuacedrus papuana and the berries of Sericolea pullei. It is more nectarivorous than the yellow-billed lorikeet. They sometimes forage together with yellow-billed lorikeets at fruiting trees, but are rarely found with other species. Its breeding season is in October. It nests in hollows in tall trees, where it lays clutches of 2 eggs. The orange-billed lorikeet is parasitised by a variety of insects, including the rhinonyssid mites Mesonyssus alisteri and Tinaminyssus trichoglossi, the philopterid chewing louse Psittaconirmus zinki, and the menoponid chewing louse Eomenopon semilunare.

== Status ==
The species is listed as being of least concern on the IUCN Red List due to its large range and lack of severe declines in its population. It is listed on Appendix II of CITES. It is common throughout most of its range and is not particularly threatened by habitat loss or the wildlife trade.
