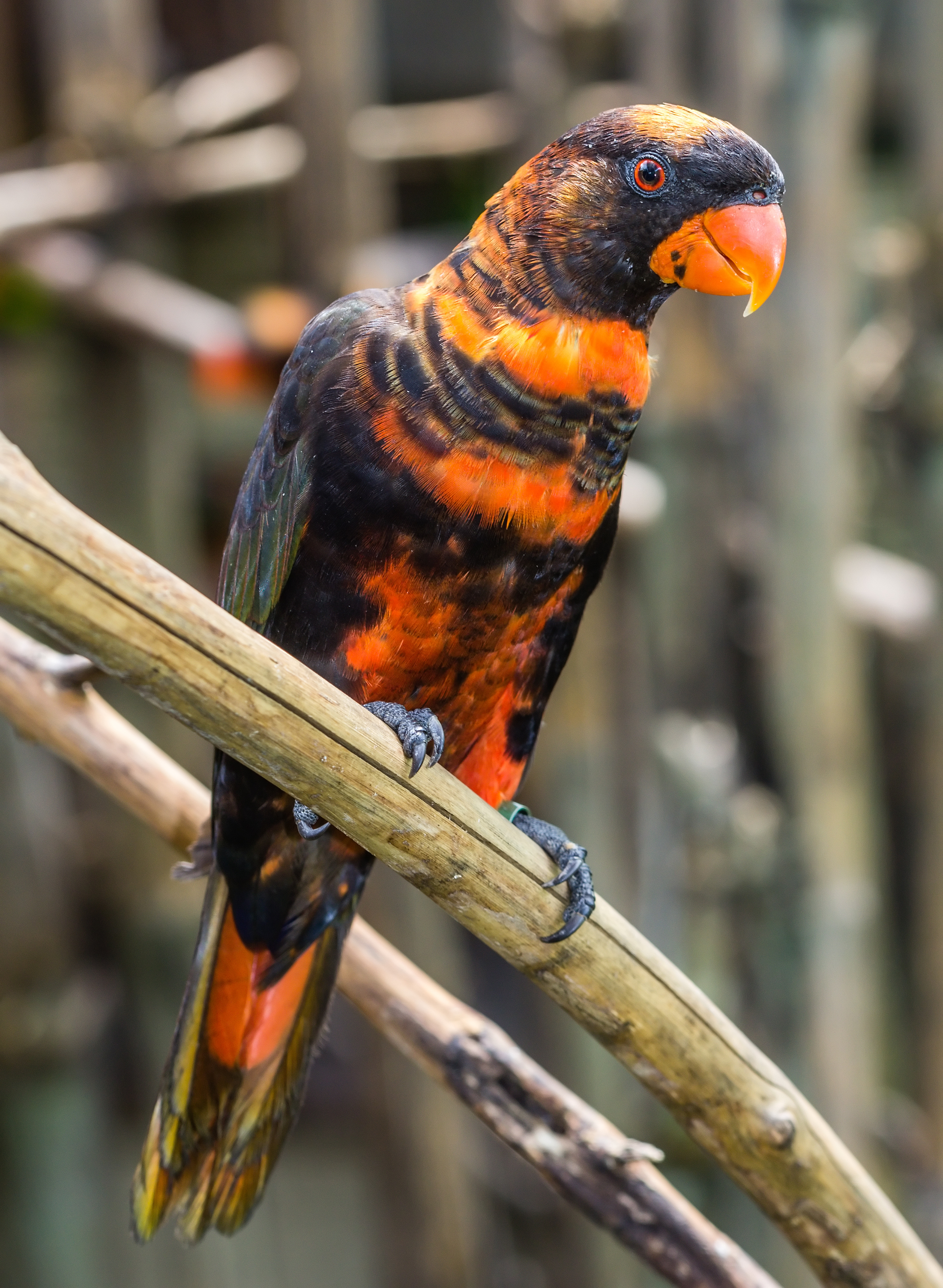
- A dusky lory at Gembira Loka Zoo, Indonesia

Conservation status
- Least Concern (IUCN 3.1)

Scientific classification
- Kingdom: Animalia
- Phylum: Chordata
- Class: Aves
- Order: Psittaciformes
- Family: Psittaculidae
- Genus: Chalcopsitta
- Species: C. fuscata

Binomial name
- Chalcopsitta fuscata (Blyth, 1858)
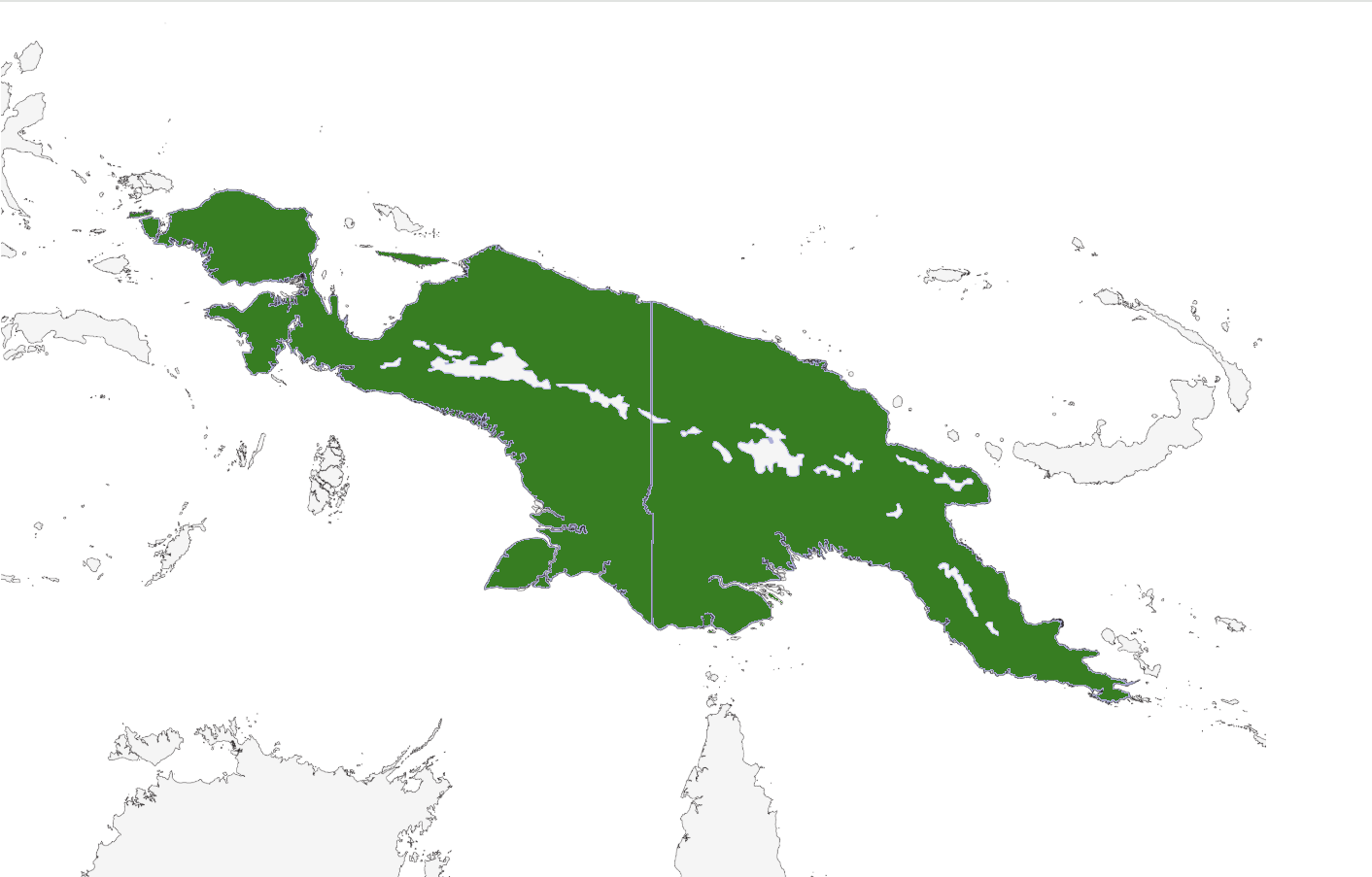
- Distribution within New Guinea Dark green: Resident

Synonyms
- Pseudeos fuscata

= Dusky lory =

Species of bird

The dusky lory (Chalcopsitta fuscata) is a species of parrot in the subfamily Loriinae of the family Psittaculidae. Alternative common names are the white-rumped lory or the dusky-orange lory. They are also known as "banded lories" or "duskies". It is also sometimes placed in the Chalcopsitta genus, but mitochondrial analyses prove that it truly belongs to the Pseudeos genus. It is native to New Guinea and the offshore islands of Batanta, Salawati and Yapen, where it inhabits a wide range of lowland and montane forest habitats.. Known for its distinctive dark plumage with bright orange or yellow breast bands, this lory is highly social and noisy, often seen flying in large flocks. Two natural color morphs occur in the wild ― an orange (or red) phase and a yellow phase ― each controlled by genetic mechanisms influencing feather pigmentation. Despite ongoing habitat loss and illegal trade, the dusky lory remains common throughout its range and is currently assessed as Least Concern by the IUCN Red List of Threatened Species.

== Description ==
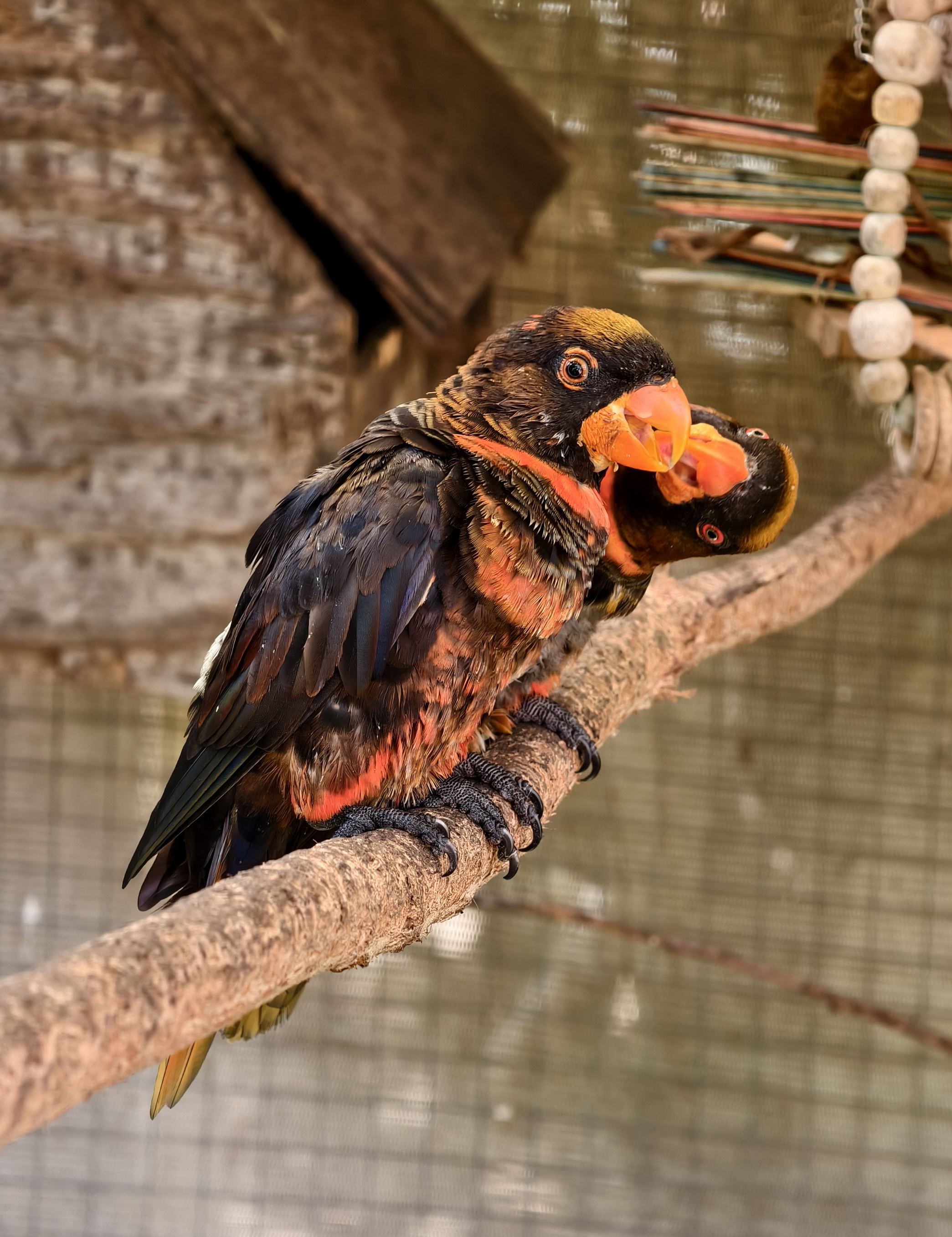
Dusky lory (Chalcopsitta fuscata), World of Birds Wildlife Sanctuary & Monkey Park, Hout Bay, South Africa

The dusky lory is short-tailed parrot about 25cm (10in) long and weights around 300 grams. Both sexes are similar in appearance, with a dark brown to blackish head, neck, and back, two bright bands across the breast, and a pale whitish or cream rump. Their legs are grey, the bill is red, the irises range from red-orange to dark brown, and the beak is orange with an area of orange skin at the base of the lower mandible. The species exhibits no sexual dimorphism, meaning males and females are visually identical. To determine the sex of an individual, DNA analysis or surgical sexing are required.

They can be found in two distinct color morphs: the “orange (or red) phase” and the “yellow phase'', which is more rare. In the orange morph, the chest and underwings are rich orange, while in the yellow morph, those areas are replaced with bright yellow. Both morphs share a prominent yellow patch on the underwing that is visible during flight.

Their feathers contain psittacofulvin pigments, unique to parrots, which produce bright red, orange, and yellow hues independently of dietary carotenoids. The average lifespan in the wild is 13 years, and their life expectancy in captivity ranges from 19 to over 30 years, depending on diet and care.

== Taxonomy ==
The specific name fuscata is derived from Latin, meaning "dark" or "black". This name is a direct reference to the bird's predominantly dark brown and blackish plumage, which provides a dramatic contrast to its vibrant orange or yellow markings.

The dusky lory was first described by Edward Blyth in 1858 from specimens collected by naturalists Alfred Russel Wallace and Baron Hermann von Rosenberg exploring northwestern New Guinea. The two men first met in May 1858 in Dorey, New Guinea, where they both independently encountered the species and recognized it as new to science.

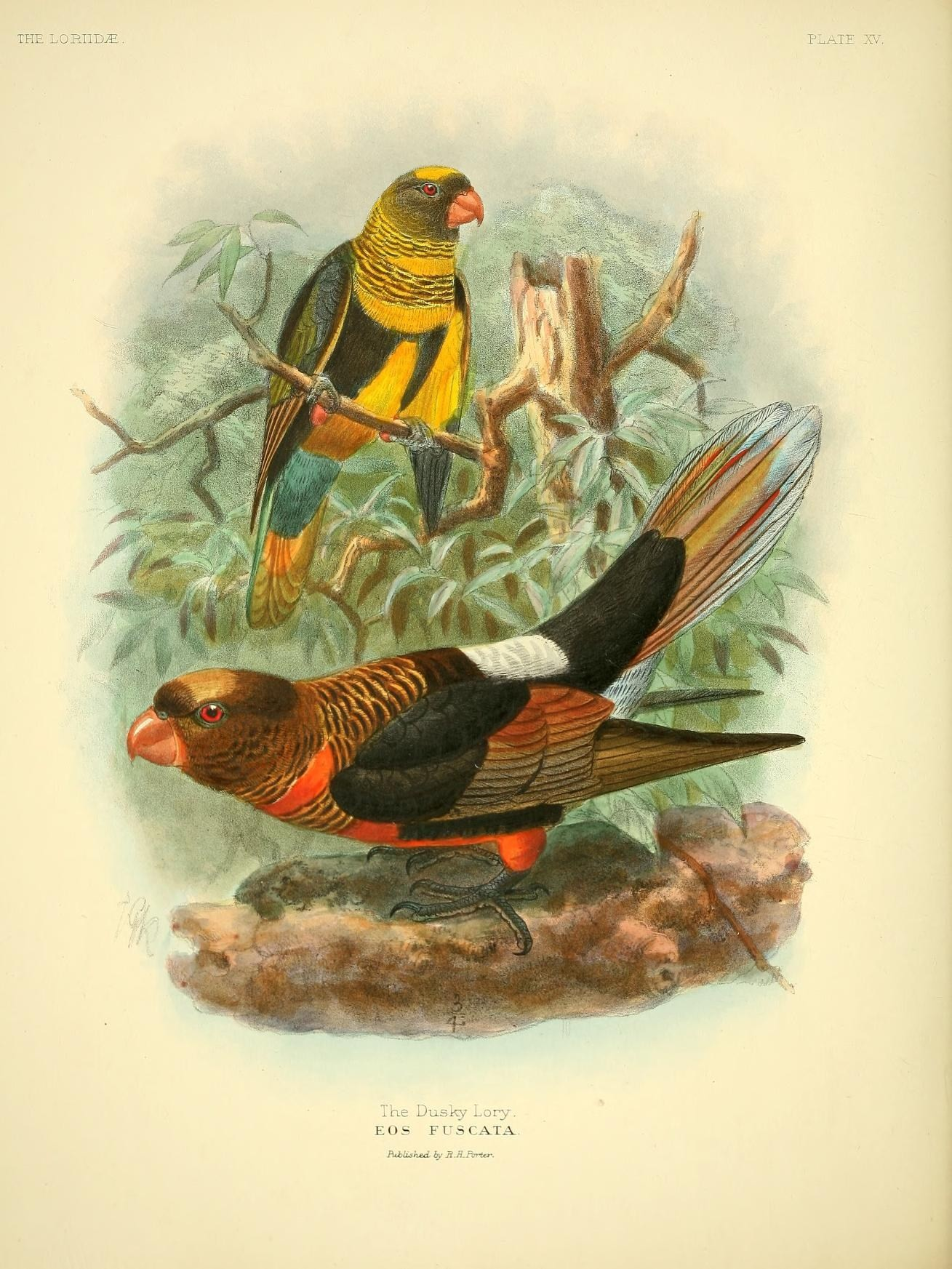
A monograph of the lories, or brush-tongued parrots : composing the family Loriinae. Plate XV.

Modern molecular phylogenetics provide a deeper understanding of its evolutionary context. The Loriinae tribe, which includes lories and lorikeets, originated roughly 10 million years ago in New Guinea and diversified across the Indo-Pacific through founder effect speciation, driven by island dispersal, the island’s complex geological history, and adaptation to nectarivory. Genetic studies have identified the dusky lory's closest relative as the cardinal lory (Pseudeos cardinalis). The evidence confirms that these two are sister species and are correctly placed together in the genus Pseudeos, distinct from the Chalcopsitta genus. Species in Pseudeos lack the distinctive, striation-like markings of Chalcopsitta and instead share a derived pattern of plumage showing more transverse barring. This classification provides the foundation for understanding the species' unique physical characteristics and genetic divergence from Chalcopsitta.

== Habitat and distribution ==
The dusky lory is endemic to Indonesia and Papua New Guinea, encompassing the region between Wallace’s Line and the Pitcairn Island group, and the main island of New Guinea. Its scope also extends to several neighboring tropical islands, including Batanta, Salawati, and Yapen, where it thrives in a diverse array of forested and semi-open environments. This geographic range provides a large extent of occurrence, estimated at 1,210,000 km².

This species is highly adaptable, occupying a wide variety of habitats across a broad elevational range. It is most commonly found in lowlands and foothills but has been observed at altitudes as high as 2,700 m on Mt. Wilhelm, exceeding its previously reported upper limit of 2,400 m.

It is commonly found along forest edges, in swamp forests, tall secondary growth forests, wooded savannas, coconut plantations, and even urban gardens. Within these habitats, the P. fuscata engages in a range of behaviors essential to its survival and social structure. The species is primarily sedentary but exhibits local, altitudinal movements linked to the flowering cycles of trees. Large flocks can sometimes be seen making predictable daily flights between feeding and roosting sites.

== Behavior ==
The dusky lory is a quintessential flocking parrot, characterized by its energetic, social, and highly vocal nature. Its daily life revolves around communal foraging, complex social interactions, and significant daily movements across its habitat.

=== Vocalizations ===
The vocal repertoire of these lories is varied, ranging from high-pitched, ringing screeches and metallic "pings" to softer warbles and continuous chattering, especially when gathered in large groups. Their flight calls are fast, ringing notes given in rapid succession. These social birds often travel in flocks of dozens to hundreds of individuals, maintaining constant vocal contact.

=== Social Behavior and Flight ===
This species is highly gregarious and is rarely seen alone. Dusky lories travel in large, loud flocks and can form communal roosts numbering in the thousands. Their flight pattern is fast and direct, and flocks are commonly observed flying high above the forest canopy. They perform distinct daily altitudinal migrations, with flocks flying towards lower altitudes in the mornings to forage and showing a varying return to higher elevations in the afternoons.

=== Diet ===
Like all lories and lorikeets, the dusky lory is primarily a nectarivore. Its brush-tipped tongue is long, muscular, and covered in threadlike papillae. These specialized papillae increase the surface area and create a capillary effect, allowing the bird to efficiently extract liquid nectar and pollen from flowers. P. fuscata also consumes soft fruits such as mango, papaya, and figs, as well as flower buds, coconut blossoms, and occasionally insect larvae or pupae for added protein. Compared to seed-eating parrots, the dusky lory's beak is structurally thinner and weaker, as it does not require the strength to crack hard nuts or seeds. Its digestive system is designed for the rapid passage of high-moisture foods. Specifically, the openings of the gizzard ― the proventriculus and the pylorus ― both lie in the median plane, a configuration which allows for the rapid passage of ingested food. This enables efficient absorption of sugars from nectar while quickly processing large volumes of liquid, resulting in characteristically runny and messy droppings. Dusky lories are active foragers, spending a majority of their day seeking food. They are known to travel up to 50 km daily and visit on average 600 flowers to meet their energy requirements.

=== Reproduction ===
This bird reaches sexual maturity at 2 to 3 years of age and forms strong monogamous pair-bonds. During the breeding season, which typically occurs between November and April, pairs become more territorial and defend nesting areas within tree cavities. The female lays two eggs, which are incubated for 24–28 days by both parents. Chicks fledge after approximately 8–9 weeks and remain dependent for several more weeks. In the wild, breeding coincides with seasonal flowering peaks, ensuring abundant nectar for chick rearing.

== Color morphs and genetics ==
The vibrant yellow-to-red coloration in parrots is produced by a unique class of pigments called psittacofulvin. The specific hue is determined by the ratio of two types of these pigments: aldehyde psittacofulvin (which produce red) and carboxyl psittacofulvin (which produce yellow).

The dusky lory exhibits one of the most well-documented cases of natural feather color polymorphism among parrots. Two stable color morphs—orange/red and yellow—coexist and interbreed freely. Genetic analyses show that this difference results from a single regulatory mutation near the ALDH3A2 gene, which alters pigment oxidation, converting red psittacofulvin pigments to yellow.

This polymorphism is estimated to have been maintained in the wild population for approximately one million years and follows a simple inheritance pattern, with yellow dominant over red. The gene acts within feather keratinocytes to regulate psittacofulvin synthesis, revealing a molecular mechanism underlying the bright coloration typical of parrots.

== Photographs showing plumage colors ==
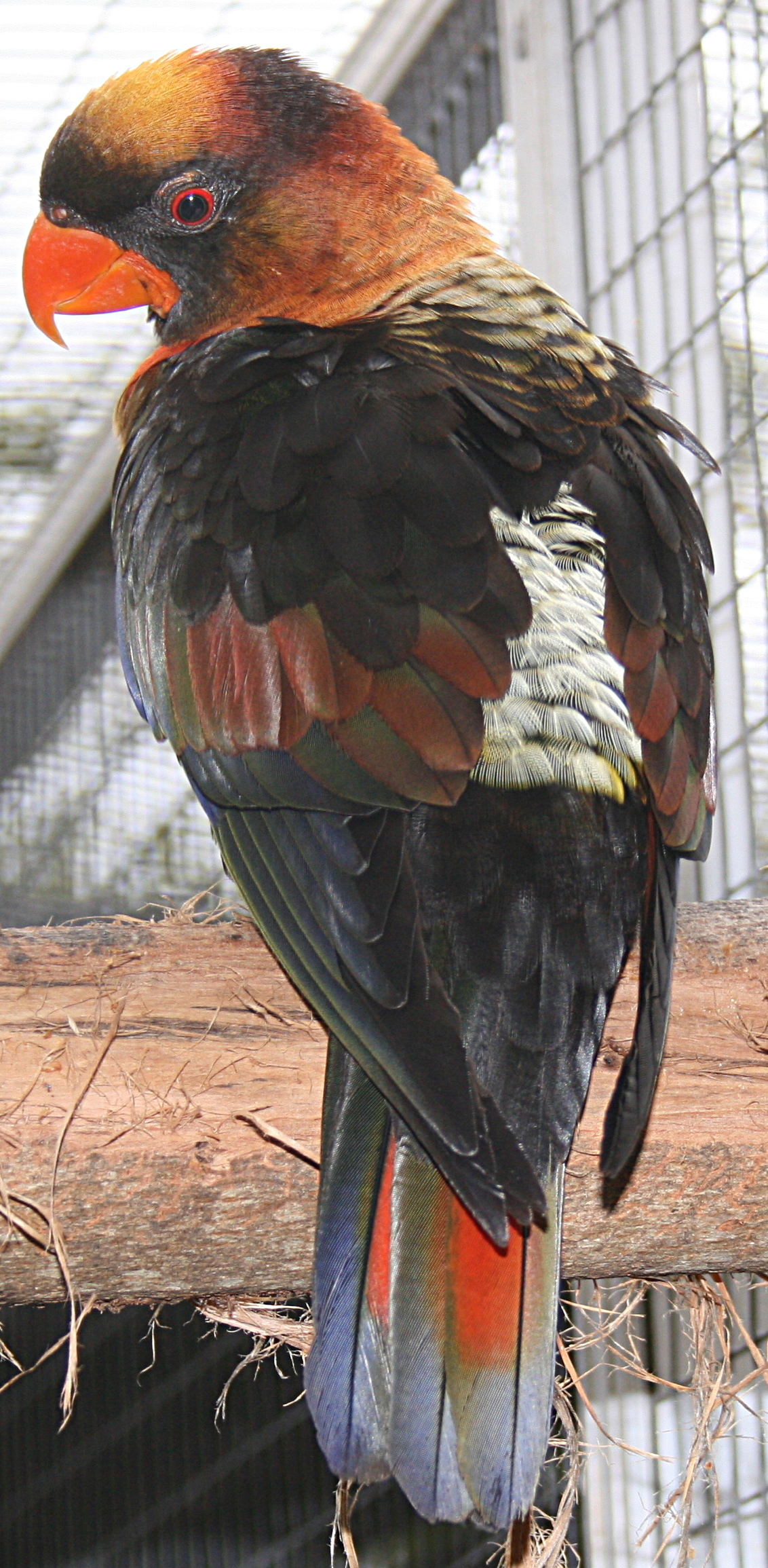
The back and rump of the adult is white

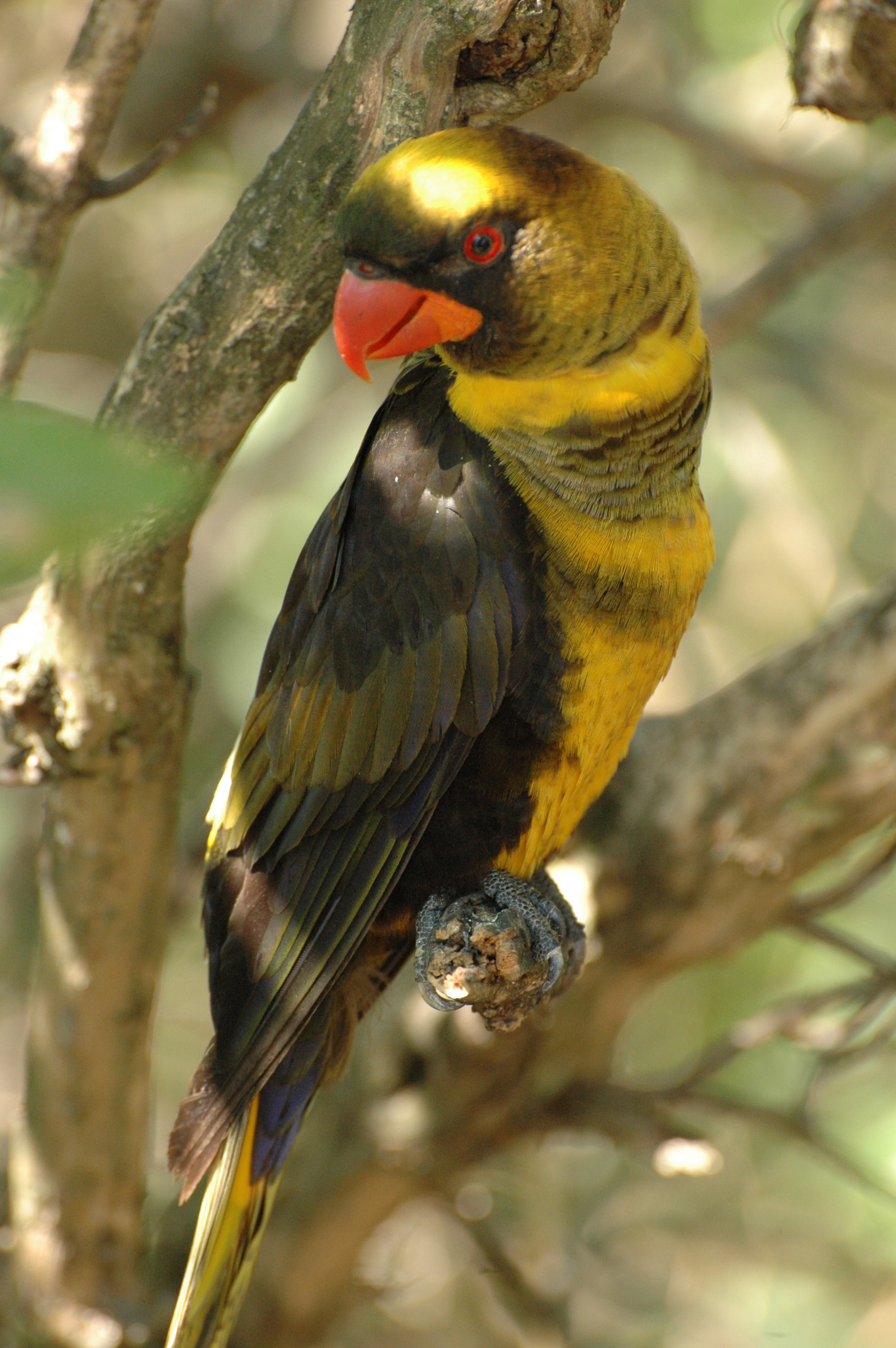
Side (yellow phase)

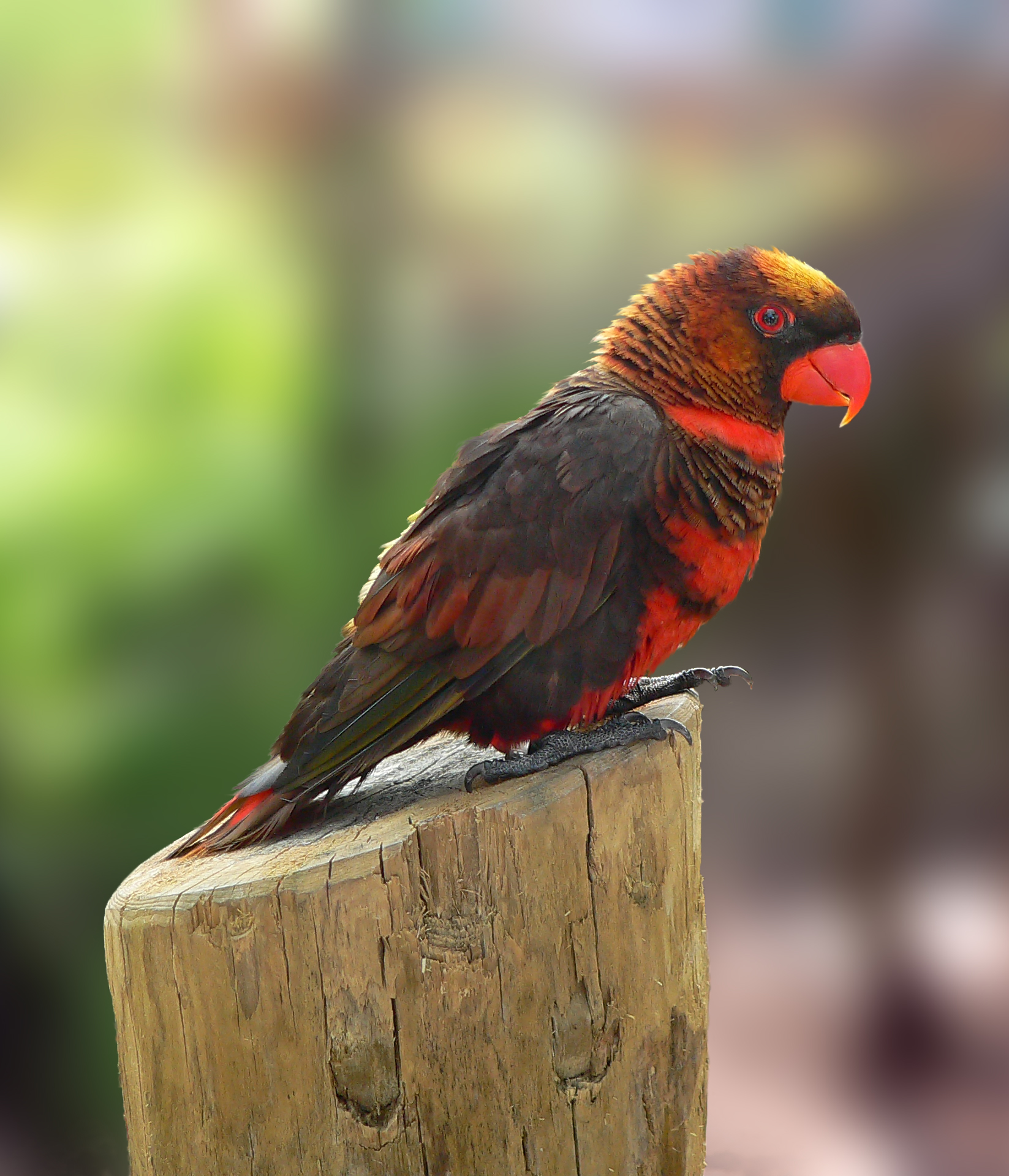
Side (orange phase)

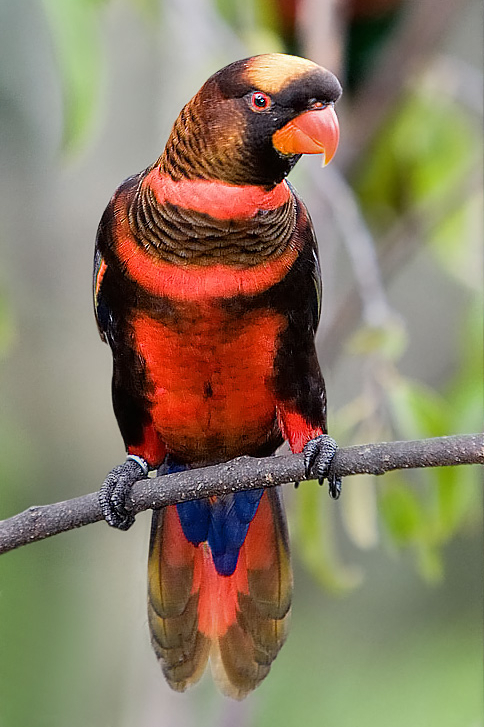
Front (orange phase)

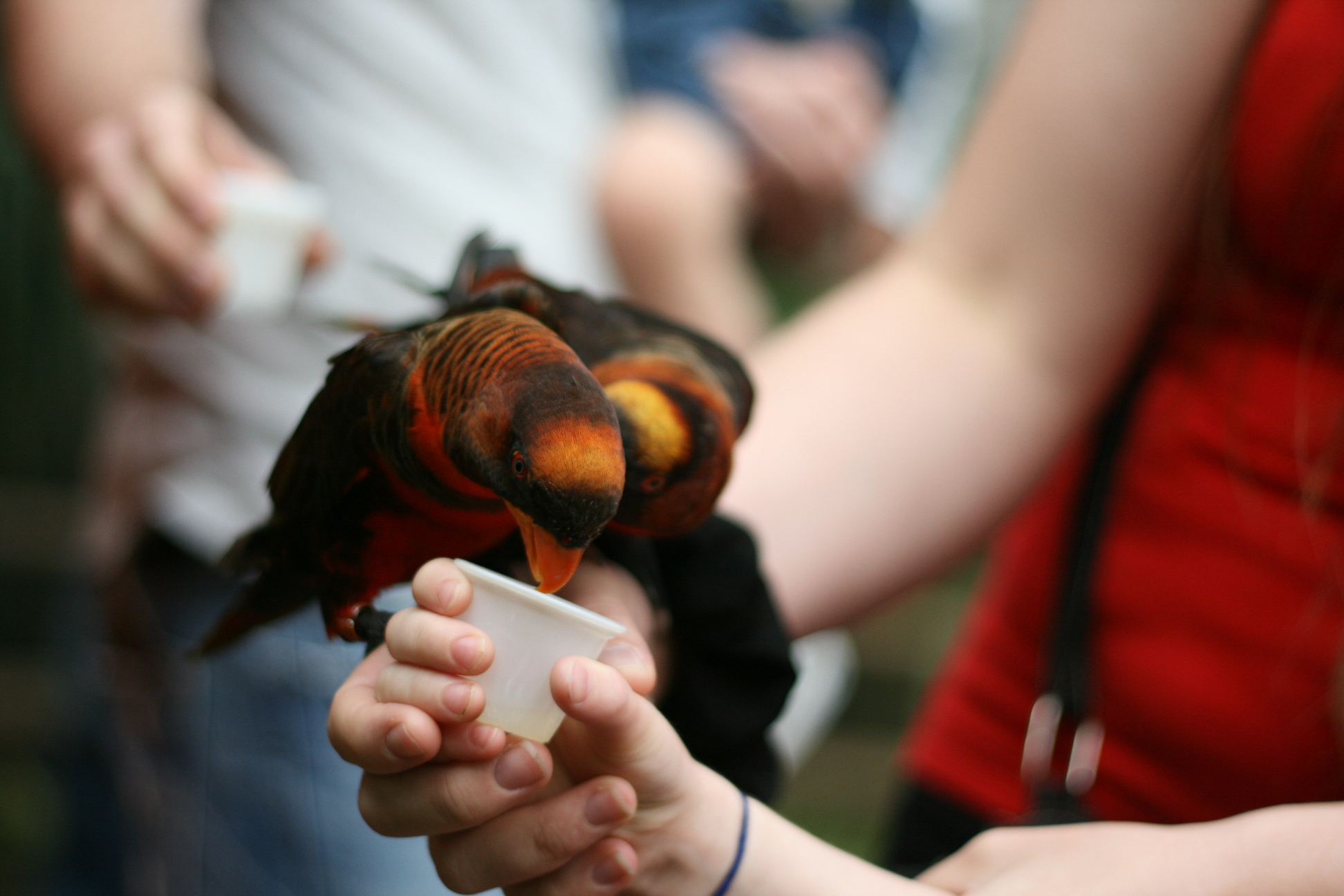
Drinking from a cup of nectar at Woburn Safari Park

== Life history ==
=== Threats and conservation ===
As of its 2024 evaluation, the Dusky Lory is assessed as Least Concern by the IUCN Red List of Threatened Species. However, it faces ongoing pressures from human activities that could impact its long-term survival. Its forest habitat is being degraded by large-scale logging and conversion to oil-palm and coconut plantations across parts of Indonesia and Papua New Guinea. These industrial activities also reduce the availability of suitable food sources for the species.

The species is also subject to illegal capture for the pet trade, particularly in Indonesia, where it is locally known as “Nuri Kelam” and commands high market value. Despite this, populations remain stable in the absence of evidence for significant declines, with an estimated extent of occurrence over 1.2 million km² (far exceeding the threshold for a vulnerable listing) and frequent sightings throughout its range.

The species benefits from protected areas and national parks across New Guinea, and its adaptability to secondary habitats supports its resilience to moderate human disturbance.

=== Aviculture and presence in zoos ===
The dusky lory has long been popular in aviculture due to its intelligence, engaging personality, playful behavior, and vibrant coloration. It was first bred successfully at the Melbourne Zoo in 1999–2000 and is maintained in several collections worldwide. It is featured at Singapore’s Jurong Bird Park in the "Lory Loft", a massive walk-in aviary housing over 1,000 free-flying lories. A few dusky lories are also housed in a large central aviary alongside many other native bird species in Ragunan Zoo, Jakarta.

The dusky lory is known for being smart, entertaining, and affectionate companion pet. They are curious and clownish, often exhibiting unique behaviors, such as sleeping on their backs or wrapping themselves in blankets. Captivity requires a spacious aviary and specialized nectar-based diets. The species can live over 25 years and remains active and social throughout its life. Captive individuals are prone to messy feeding behavior due to their liquid diet and should be provided with frequent cleaning and enrichment opportunities.

=== In culture and observation ===
The dusky lory is a familiar sight in much of New Guinea, where flocks are often heard before they are seen, darting across forest canopies in rapid flight. Local communities recognize the bird’s loud calls and bright markings as symbols of energy and vitality. Early naturalists, including Wallace, described it as “boisterous and charming, a bird born from embers” .
