= Gembira Loka Zoo =

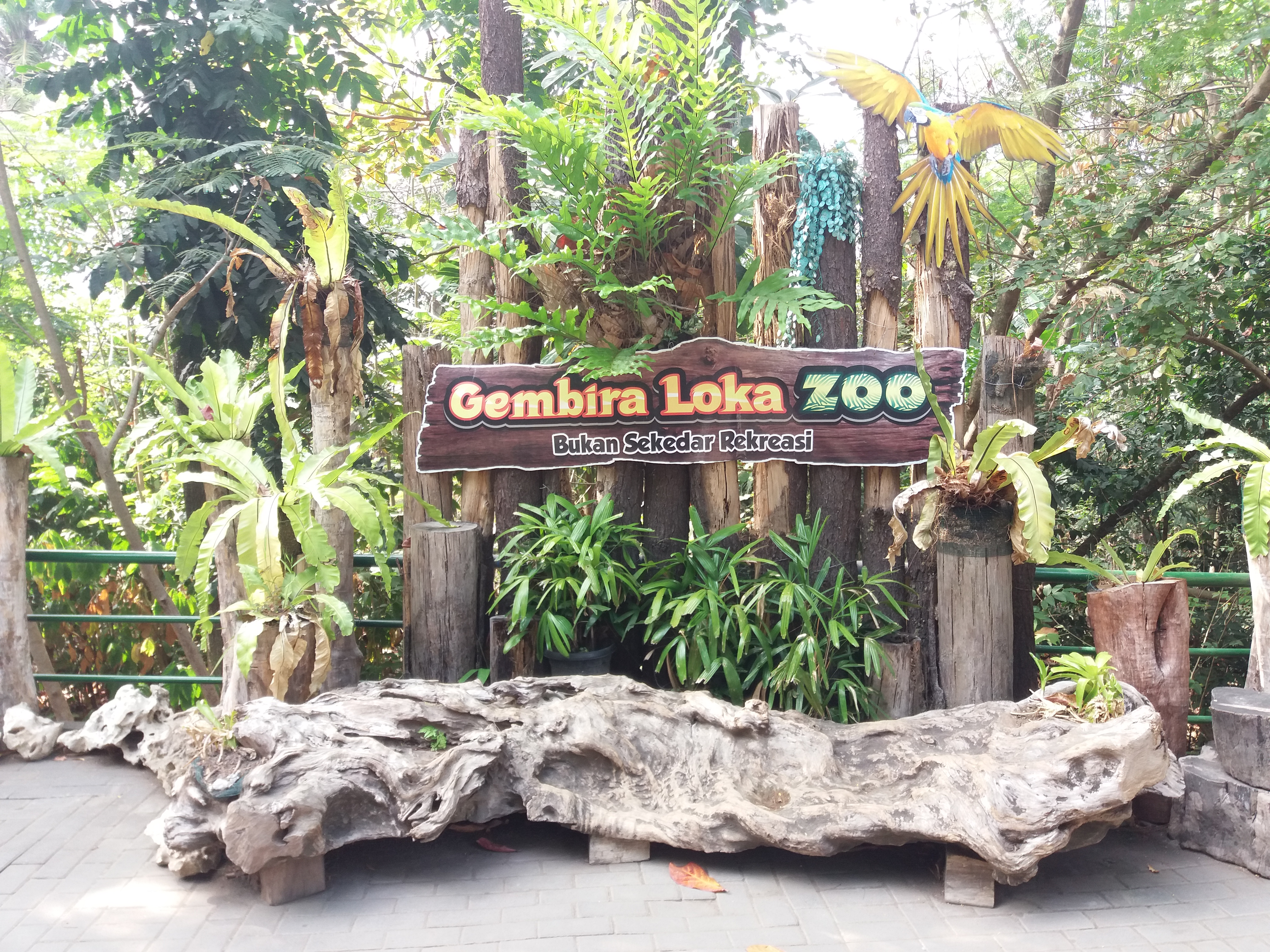
- Gembira Loka Zoo nameplate
- Interactive map of Gembira Loka Zoo
- 7.803967997412671°S 110.39787329735024°E
- Date opened: 1956; 70 years ago
- Location: Kotagede, Yogyakarta, Indonesia
- Land area: 22 hectares (54 acres)
- No. of animals: 470
- Memberships: WAZA, SEAZA, PKBSI
- Public transit: Trans Jogja: 1B, 2A (Kusumanegara - Gembira Loka)
- Website: www.gembiralokazoo.com

Gembira Loka Zoo (Indonesian: Kebun Binatang Gembira Loka; Javanese: ꦏꦼꦧꦺꦴꦤ꧀ꦫꦗꦒꦼꦩ꧀ꦧꦶꦫꦭꦺꦴꦏ, romanized: Kêbon Raja Gêmbira Loka) is a zoological garden located in Yogyakarta, Special Region of Yogyakarta, Indonesia. Gembira Loka Zoo was opened in 1956 and comprises a botanical garden, orchid nursery, (artificial) lake, children's park, numerous scenic bridges across the Gajahwong River, and a collection of approximately 470 animals, most notable of which are its native Indonesian tigers, leopards, Komodo dragons, saltwater crocodiles, orangutans, and gibbons, as well as African animals such as lions, camels and hippopotamus. The park is 54 acres (21.8 hectares) in size.

In 2019, an area called Zona Cakar ("Scratch Zone") was opened, focusing on mammalian carnivores, especially cats.

Gembira Loka Zoo has received many animals from various countries, through trade and gifts, such as the six African penguins from Singapore Zoo, and eight lesser flamingos from Tanzania.

== Zones ==
Gembira Loka has over 5 zones, each representing certain groups of animals from primates to reptiles as well as birds and carnivorans. Other exhibits include an aquarium and a petting zoo.

=== Primate Zone ===
- Agile gibbon
- Müller's gibbon
- Tufted capuchin
- Tonkean macaque
- Siamang
- Heck's macaque
- Guianan squirrel monkey
- Common marmoset
- Black-tufted marmoset
- Celebes crested macaque
- East Javan langur
- Mitered langur

Additionally, non-primate species like Asian palm civet, Malayan civet, and South American coati are present in the Primate Zone.

=== Petting Zoo ===
Visitors can feed and interact with various domesticated animals.

- African spurred tortoise
- Alpaca
- Chicken
- Donkey
- Miniature pig
- Nigerian Dwarf goat
- Rabbit
- Shetland pony
- Turkey

=== Aquarium ===
- Chinese giant salamander
- Emperor snakehead
- Fahaka pufferfish
- Giant snakehead
- Gulf saratoga
- Peacock bass
- Red-bellied piranha
- Saddled bichir
- Senegal bichir
- Tiger sorubim
- Tinfoil barb

A separate, larger freshwater tank is present just across the Aquarium, displaying pirarucu, alligator gars, pacus, and redtail catfish.

=== Reptile and Amphibian Park ===
- Aldabra giant tortoise
- Burmese python
- False gharial
- Green iguana
- Lesser Sunda Islands pit viper

=== Bird Park ===
- Asian fairy-bluebird
- Black lory
- Black-backed swamphen
- Black-capped lory
- Black-winged myna
- Blue-fronted amazon
- Blue-streaked lory
- Coconut lorikeet
- Common emerald dove
- Dusky lory
- Fischer's lovebird
- Grey parrot
- Hooded butcherbird
- Java peafowl
- Masked lapwing
- Moluccan king parrot
- Palm cockatoo
- Red lory
- Red-and-green macaw
- Salmon-crested cockatoo
- Sun conure
- Sunda teal
- Tanimbar corella
- Victoria crowned pigeon
- Wandering whistling duck
- Wreathed hornbill

Water birds like the African penguins, Australian pelicans, black swans, lesser flamingos, and little black cormorants are housed in separate exhibits.

Other specific aviary complex houses various native birds of prey, like barred eagle-owl, brahminy kite, buffy fish owl, changeable hawk-eagle, crested serpent eagle, and white-bellied sea eagle.

=== Carnivora Zone (Zona Cakar) ===
- Asian small-clawed otter
- Fishing cat
- Javan leopard
- Serval
- Sumatran tiger
- Spotted hyena
- Malayan sun bear

=== Miscellaneous ===
In the zoo's western entrance, two exhibits display cream-coloured giant squirrels and Prevost's squirrels. Adjacent to the squirrels, two exhibits displaying South American coatis and Sunda porcupines are present. The zoo's herbivores collection is housed in a row of exhibits located in the northern part of the zoo. These species are Ankole-Watusi, nilgai, South African ostrich, northern cassowary, Malayan tapir, South American tapir, and agile wallaby. Two exhibits for dromedary camels and common hippopotamus are located nearby.

Visitors can interact and feed the zoo's Sumatran elephants. The zoo's Bornean orangutans and chimpanzees are housed on a small island surrounded by a wet moat. Other species in the zoo are meerkats, capybaras, saltwater crocodiles, Javan rusa deer, pygmy hippopotamus, binturong, Java mouse-deer, and African lions.

== Gallery ==
Species found in Gembira Loka

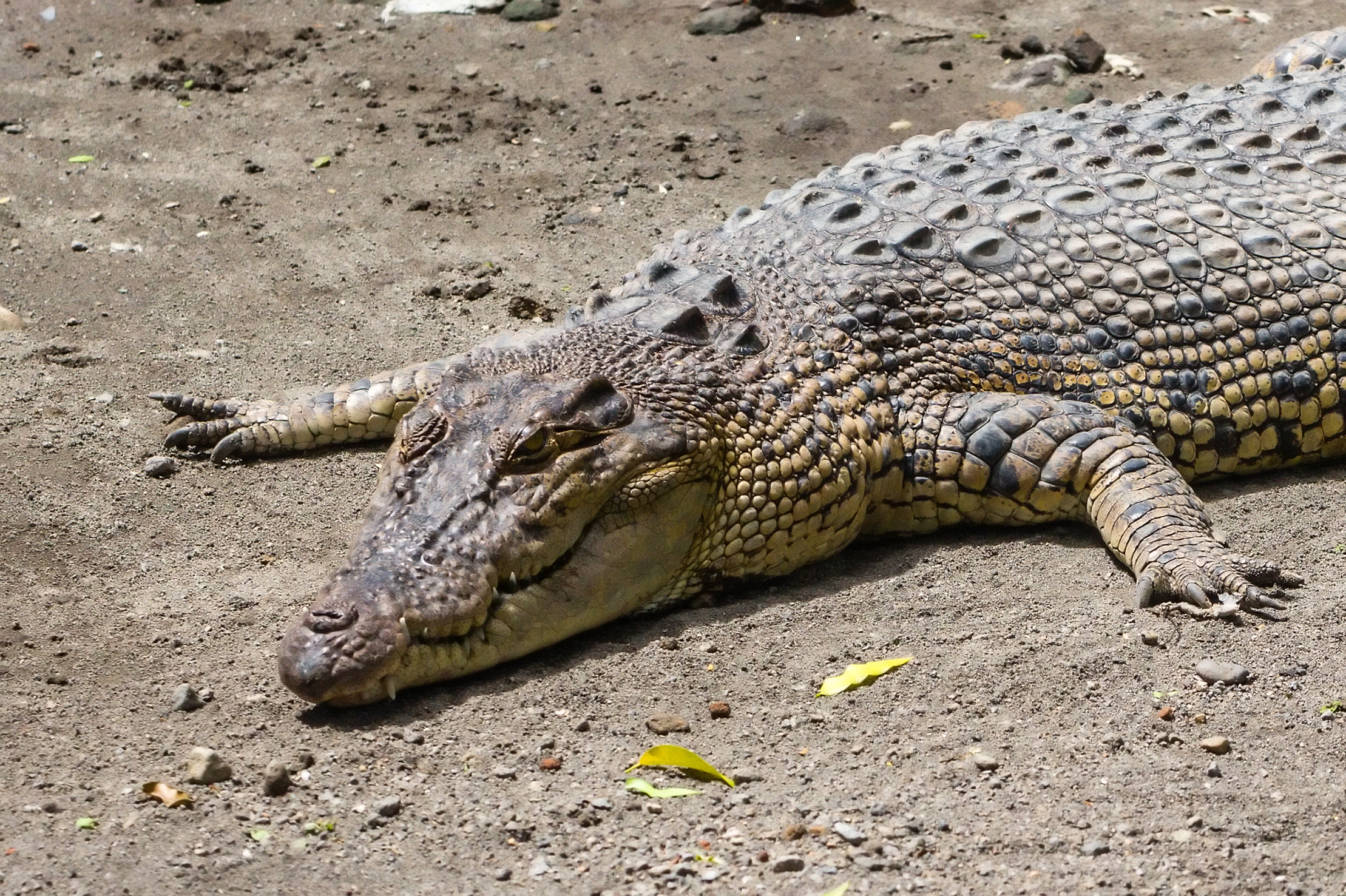
Saltwater crocodile

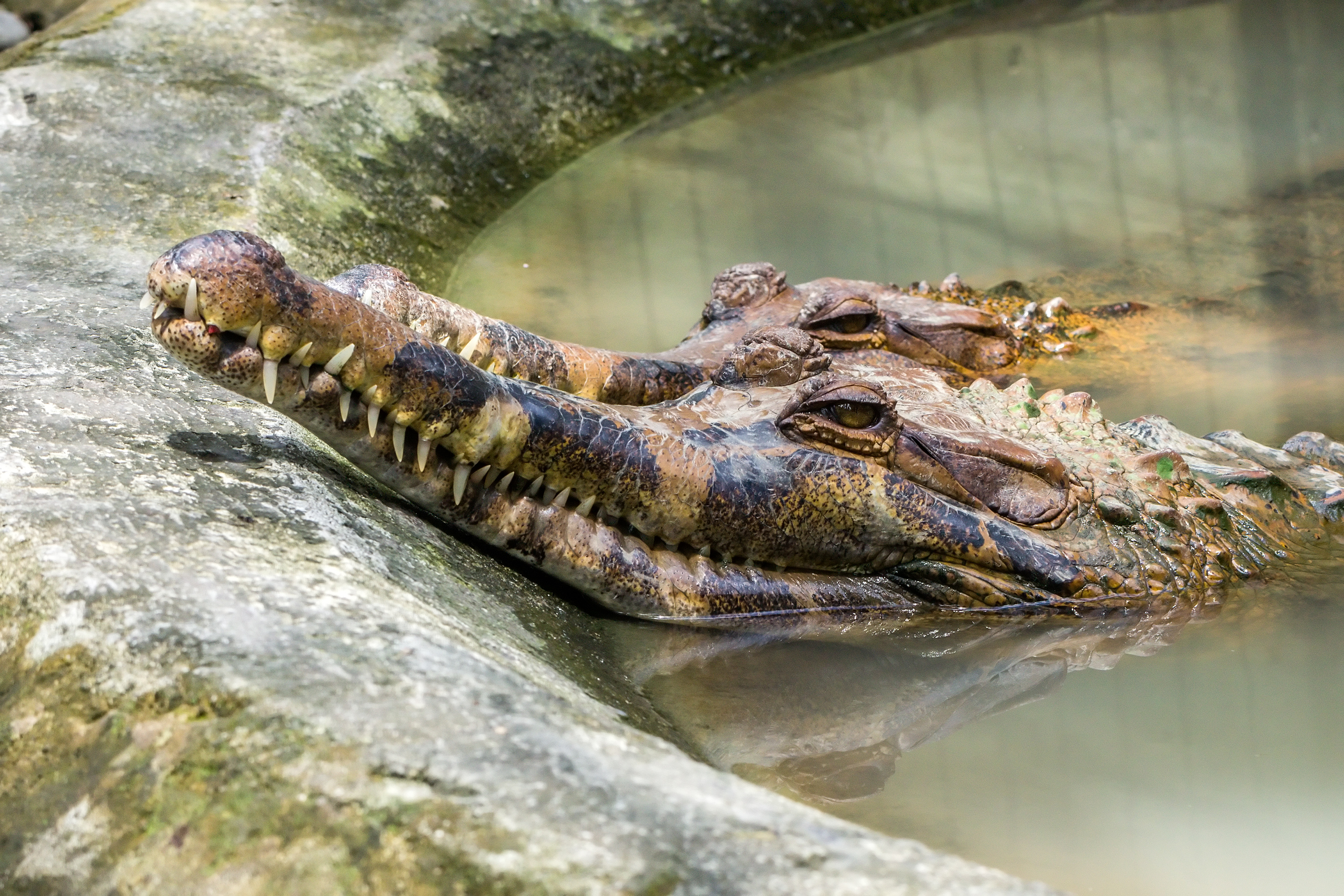
False gharial

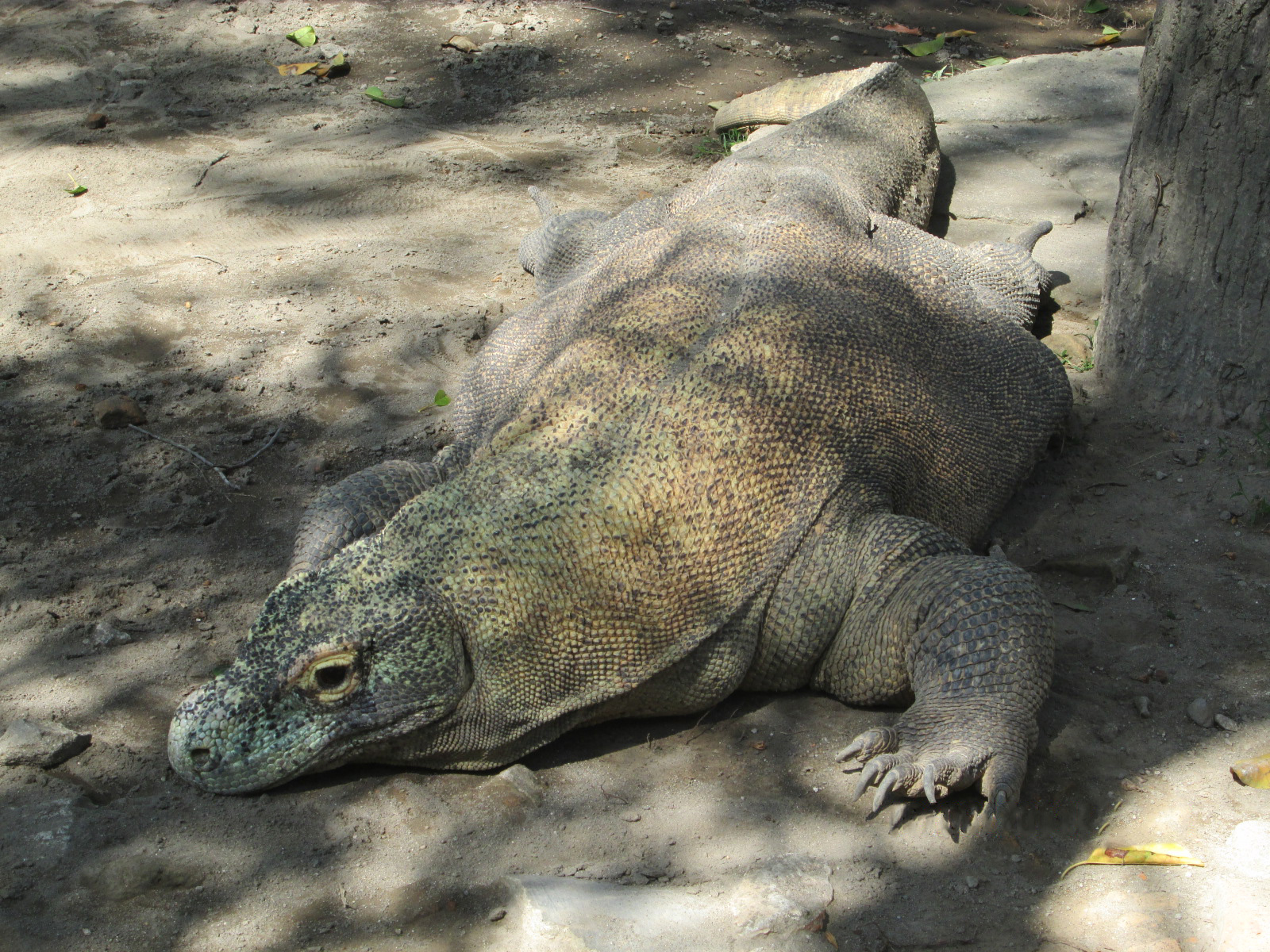
Komodo dragon

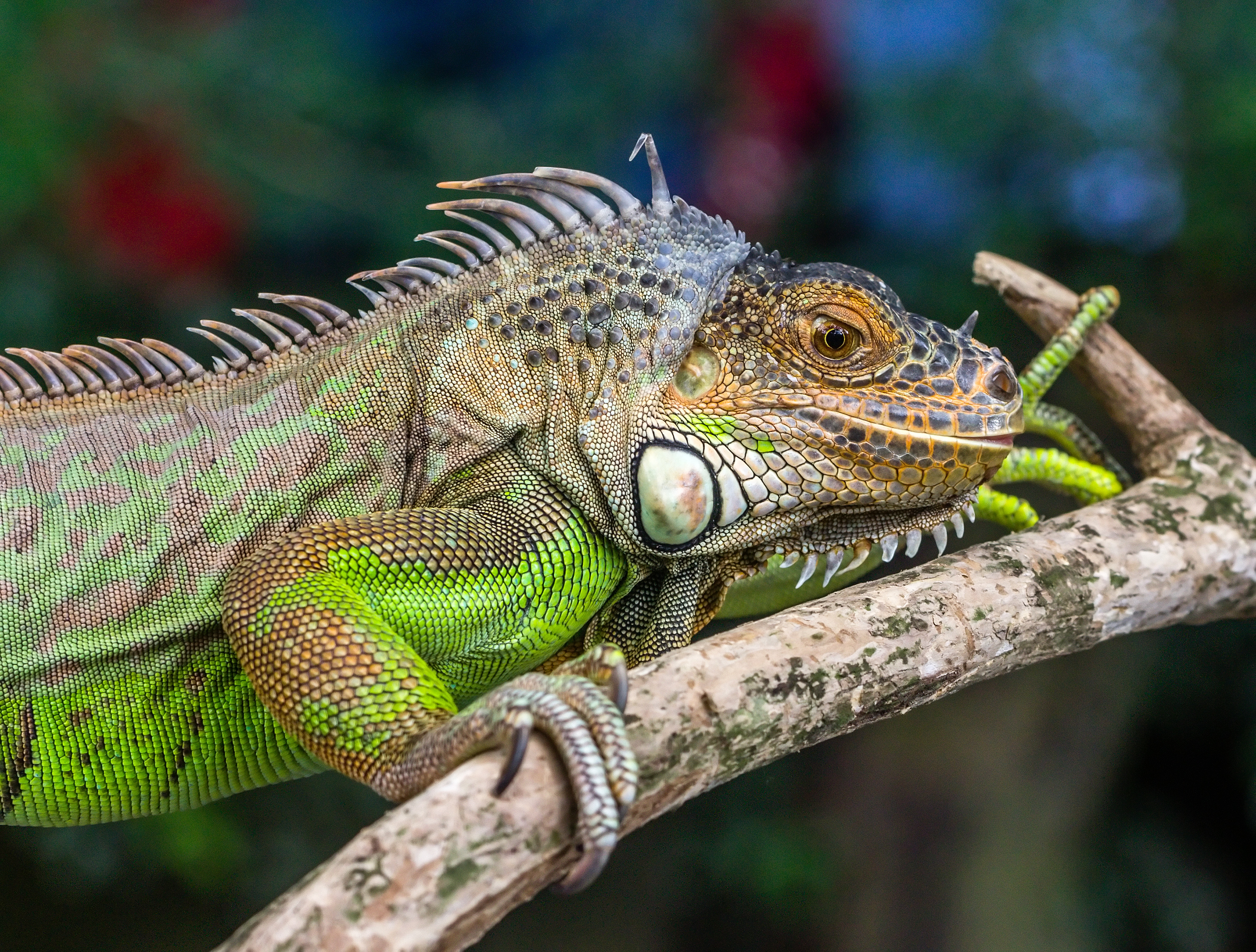
Green iguana

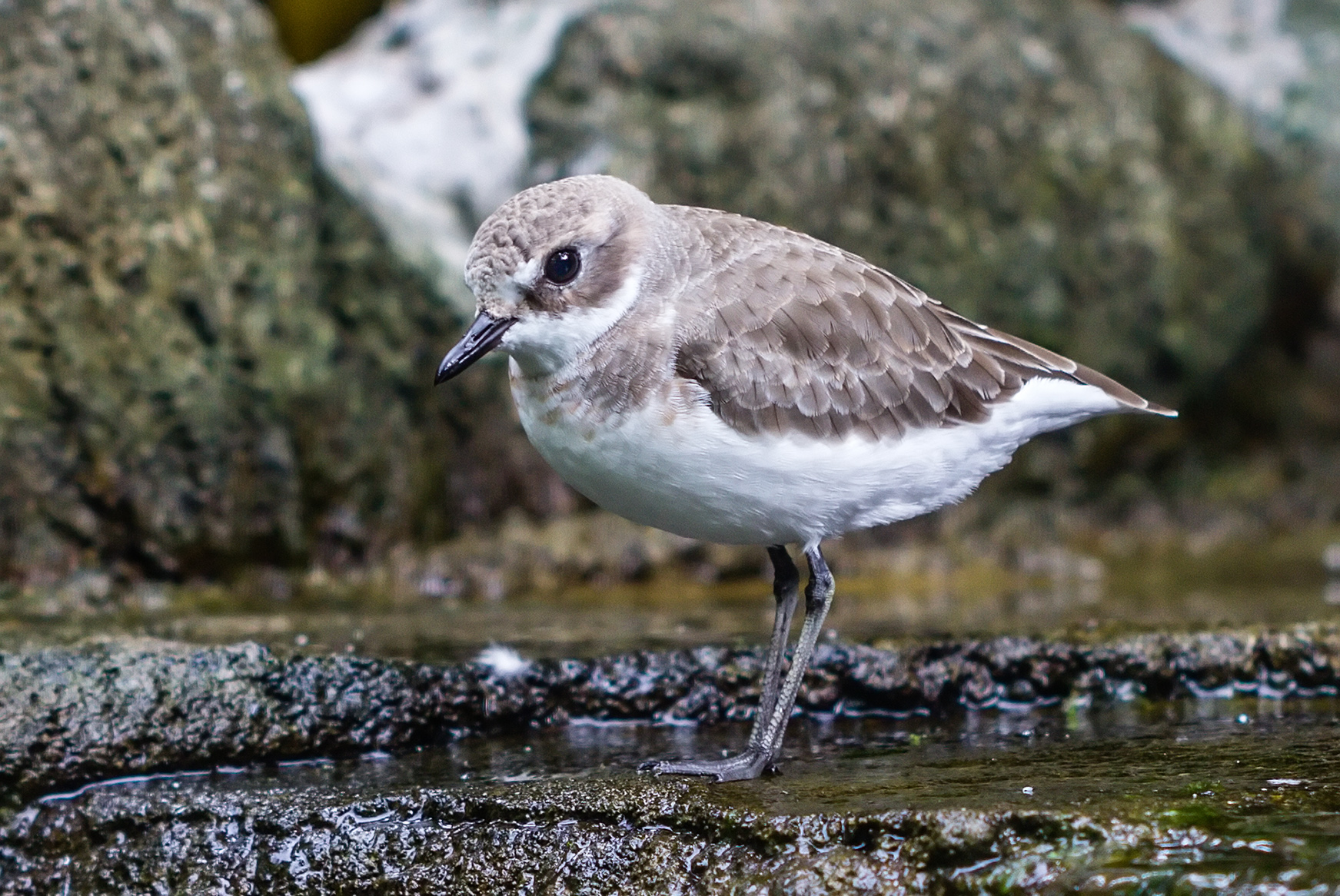
Greater sand plover

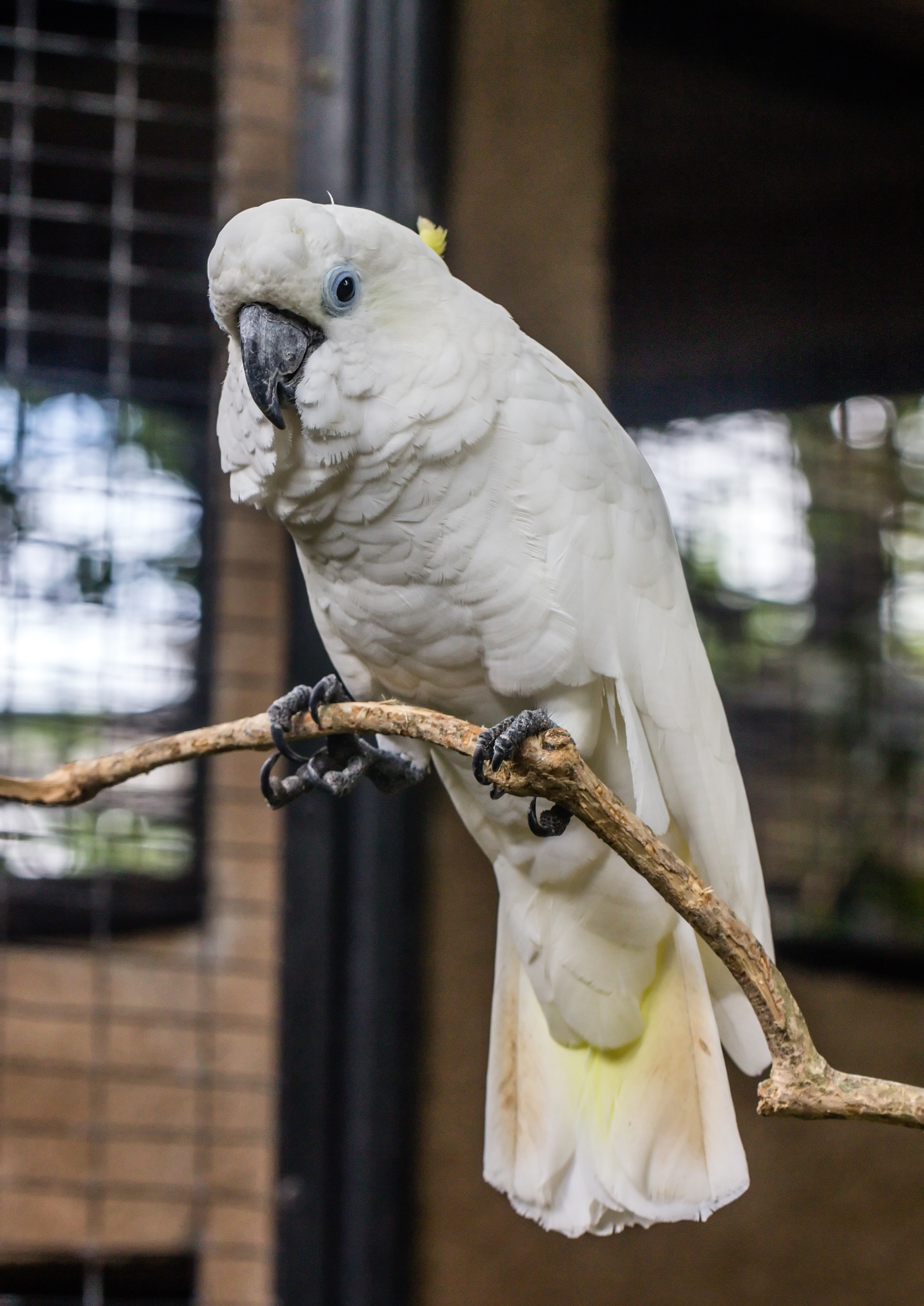
Triton cockatoo

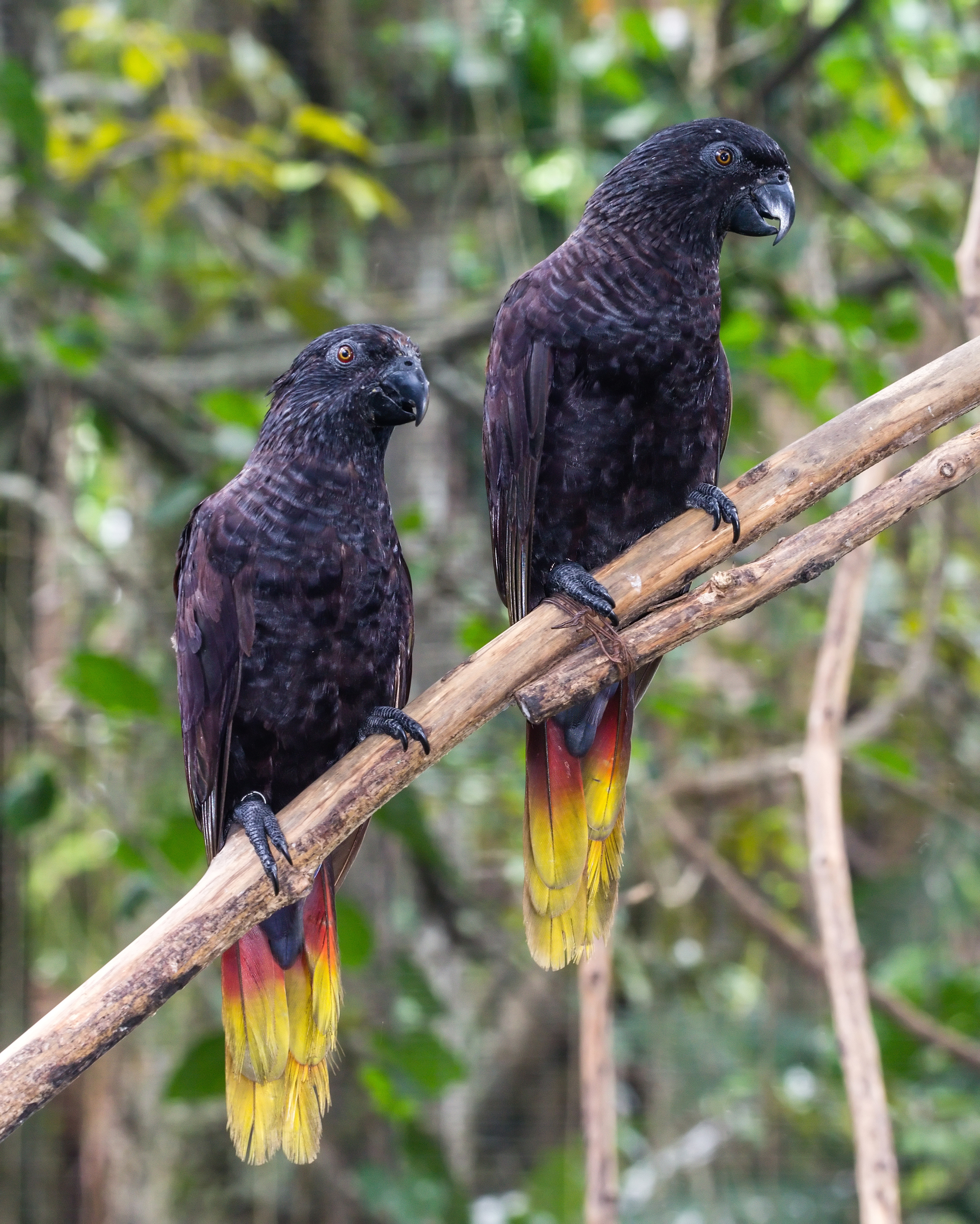
Black lory

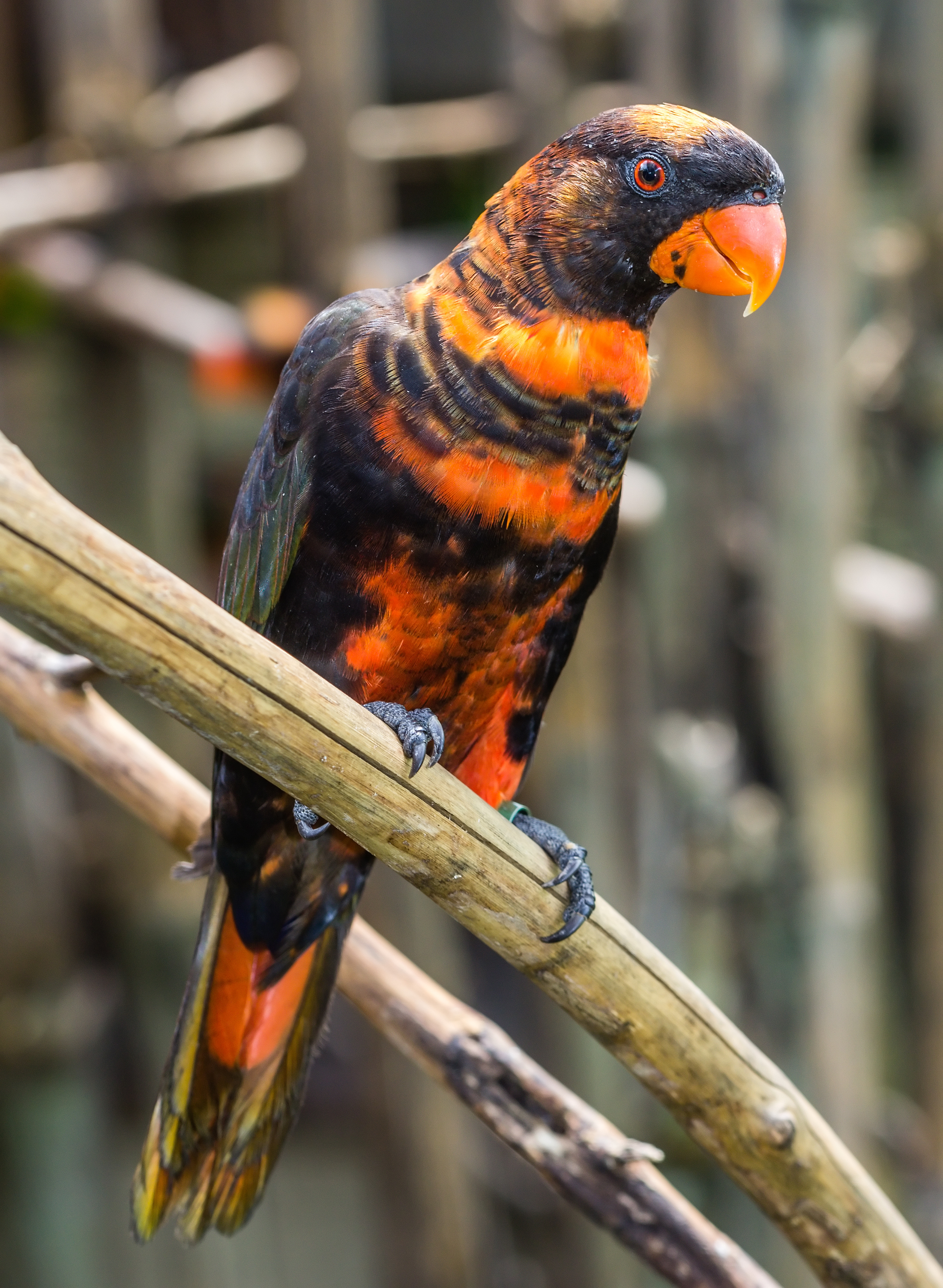
Dusky lory
