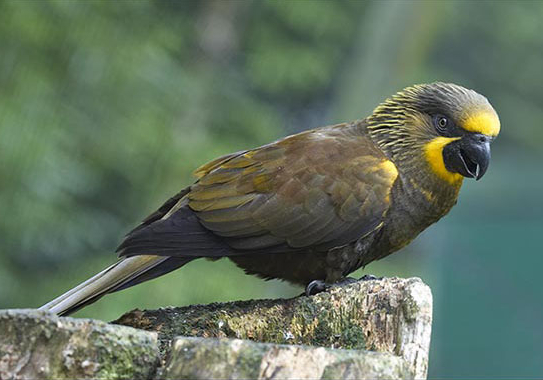

Conservation status
- Least Concern (IUCN 3.1)

Scientific classification
- Kingdom: Animalia
- Phylum: Chordata
- Class: Aves
- Order: Psittaciformes
- Family: Psittaculidae
- Genus: Chalcopsitta
- Species: C. duivenbodei

Binomial name
- Chalcopsitta duivenbodei Dubois, 1884

= Brown lory =

Species of bird

The brown lory (Chalcopsitta duivenbodei), also called Duyvenbode's lory, is a species of parrot in the family Psittaculidae native to northern New Guinea.

== Taxonomy ==
The brown lory is one of three species in the genus Chalcopsitta. Within the genus, it is basal to the two other species.

The generic name comes from the Greek khalkos, meaning bronze, and the Modern Latin psitta, meaning parrot. The specific epithet commemorates the Dutch merchant Maarten Dirk van Renesse van Duivenbode.

The species is monotypic. Populations from northeastern New Guinea are sometimes treated as a distinct subspecies, C. d. syringanuchalis, on the basis of differences in plumage. Birds from the Sepik River area have also been proposed as a separate subspecies C. d. intermedia, but are almost universally subsumed into the nominate or (where two subspecies are recognised) into syringanuchalis.

== Description ==
The brown lory has a black beak, yellow-streaked face, white tail and mostly dark brown plumage.

== Behaviour and ecology ==
=== Breeding ===
Breeding occurs in April. In captivity, clutches were of two eggs, with an incubation period of 24 days and a nestling period of nearly 11 weeks.

== Habitat and conservation ==
The brown lory is found in northern New Guinea. Its natural habitat is subtropical or tropical moist lowland forests, with elevations up to 150 m (492 ft). It is considered generally uncommon in its range, though it is locally common in certain areas (such as the Puwani River area south of Vanimo).

== Status ==
The species is listed as least-concern by the IUCN. However, its population is thought to be declining. The overall population is estimated at 50,000 individuals.
