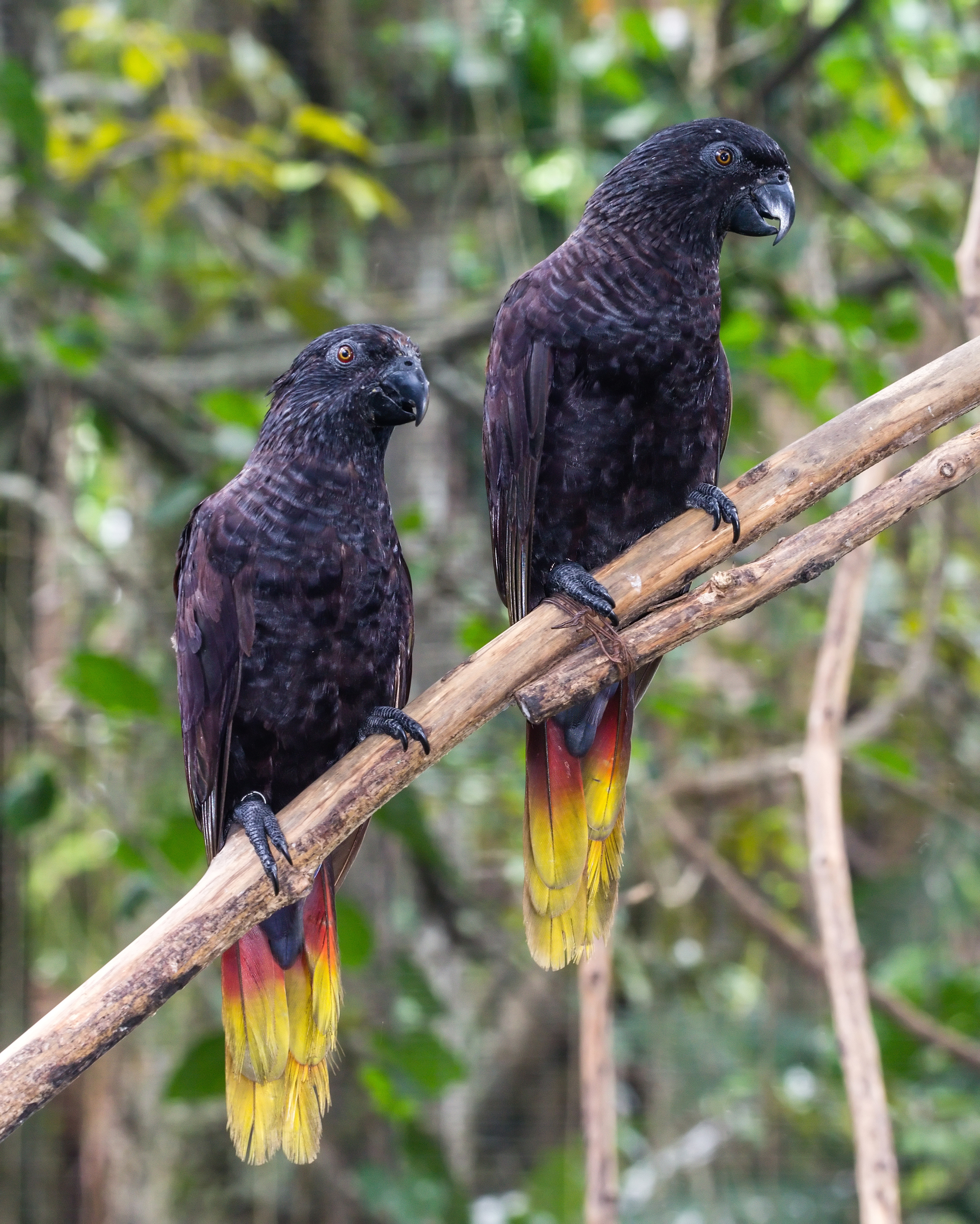
- At Gembira Loka Zoo, Yogyakarta

Conservation status
- Least Concern (IUCN 3.1)

Scientific classification
- Kingdom: Animalia
- Phylum: Chordata
- Class: Aves
- Order: Psittaciformes
- Family: Psittaculidae
- Genus: Chalcopsitta
- Species: C. atra

Binomial name
- Chalcopsitta atra (Scopoli, 1786)

Synonyms
- Psittacus ater Scopoli, 1786

= Black lory =

Species of bird

The black lory (Chalcopsitta atra), is a medium-sized, blackish parrot with black bill, dark grey feet and long rounded tail. It has yellow and red under-tail. The sexes are similar. It is native to West Papua in Indonesia.

The black lory is evaluated as Least Concern on IUCN Red List of Threatened Species.

== Description ==
The black lory is 32 cm (13 in) long and has a black bill. Its plumage is mostly black with a blue rump. Red markings on face, thighs, and tail vary between the three subspecies. Males and females are similar in external appearance.

== Taxonomy ==
The species was given its formal name by the naturalist Giovanni Antonio Scopoli. Scopoli did not in fact examine any specimens, but used the informal description by the explorer Pierre Sonnerat published in his book Voyage à la Nouvelle-Guinée (1776). The determination was accurate enough for the name to be valid, so Scopoli is credited as the author of this taxon.

Three subspecies of the black lory are recognized:

Chalcopsitta atra (Scopoli, 1786)

- Chalcopsitta atra atra (Scopoli, 1786), native to western Bird's Head Peninsula of the Indonesian province of West Papua, and nearby islands.
- Chalcopsitta atra bernsteini Rosenberg, 1861, on the Indonesian island of Misool.
- Chalcopsitta atra insignis Oustalet, 1878, on eastern Bird's Head Peninsula, nearby islands, and the Onin and Bomberai Peninsulas of West Papua.

== Cited texts ==
- Forshaw, Joseph M. (2006). Parrots of the World; an Identification Guide. Illustrated by Frank Knight. Princeton University Press. ISBN 0-691-09251-6.
