= Red-fronted lorikeet =

Conservation status
- Least Concern (IUCN 3.1)

Scientific classification
- Kingdom: Animalia
- Phylum: Chordata
- Class: Aves
- Order: Psittaciformes
- Family: Psittaculidae
- Genus: Hypocharmosyna
- Species: H. rubronotata

Binomial name
- Hypocharmosyna rubronotata (Wallace, 1862)

Synonyms
- Glossopsitta rubronotata (Wallace, 1862); Coriphilus rubronotatus (Wallace, 1862)

Species of bird

The red-fronted lorikeet (Hypocharmosyna rubronotata), also known as the red-spotted lorikeet or red-rumped lorikeet, is a species of parrot in the family Psittaculidae. It is found in northern New Guinea and the island of Biak. Its natural habitat is subtropical or tropical moist montane forests.

== Taxonomy ==
This species was formerly placed in the genus Charmosyna. It was moved to the resurrected genus Hypocharmosyna based on a molecular phylogenetic study published in 2020.

Two subspecies are recognised:

- H. r. rubronotata (Wallace, 1862) – Found on Salawati, the West Papuan Islands, Irian Jaya, and New Guinea.
- H. r. kordoana (Meyer, AB, 1874) – Found on Biak, Geelvink Bay, and Irian Jaya.

== Description ==
The red-fronted lorikeet is around 17 cm (6.7 in) in length and weighs 30–35 g (1.1–1.2 oz). They are sexually dimorphic and exhibit a large difference in appearance between sexes. The males of rubronotata possess red forecrowns with red bills and orange eyes. They have purple or blue ear coverts which are streaked with a paler blue along with red underwing coverts. They have a yellow-tipped green tail, with the base of side tail feathers being red. The females have green forecrowns with green ear coverts which are streaked with green or yellow. They also have green underwing coverts and red markings on the upper tail coverts. The males of kordoana tend to have larger but paler forecrown along with ear coverts that more bluish than purple. The females look the same as rubronotata. Juveniles look the same as adult females, but juvenile males additionally have red underwing coverts and dark and unstreaked ear covert, a yellow underwing band. They have brown beaks with pale brown eyes.

They make soft, harsh sounds while in flight. They have also been observed making sharp kss notes.

== Distribution and habitat ==
The red-fronted lorikeet inhabits northern New Guinea and the island of Biak. It is found in humid forest, forest edges and coconut plantations, and is also occasionally observed in trees and shrubs in open country up to an elevation of 900 m (2,950 ft) above sea level.

== Behaviour and ecology ==
These parakeets have been observed in small flocks of up to 10 birds flying above the forest. They will feed with other species of lorikeet while feeding on flowers in the canopy.

=== Breeding ===
The breeding season is in July-August. Eggs are laid in clutches of 2. The eggs are 17.0 mm × 13.5 mm (0.67 in × 0.53 in) in size. The eggs have an incubation period of 23 days, and chicks are fledged by the age of 7 weeks.

=== Food and feeding ===
The lorikeets feed on pollen, nectar, flowers and seeds.

== Relationship with humans ==
The parrots are uncommon pets.

== Conservation ==
The species is listed as least concern and seems to have a stable population. Listed as Cites II species on Cites Checklist.
