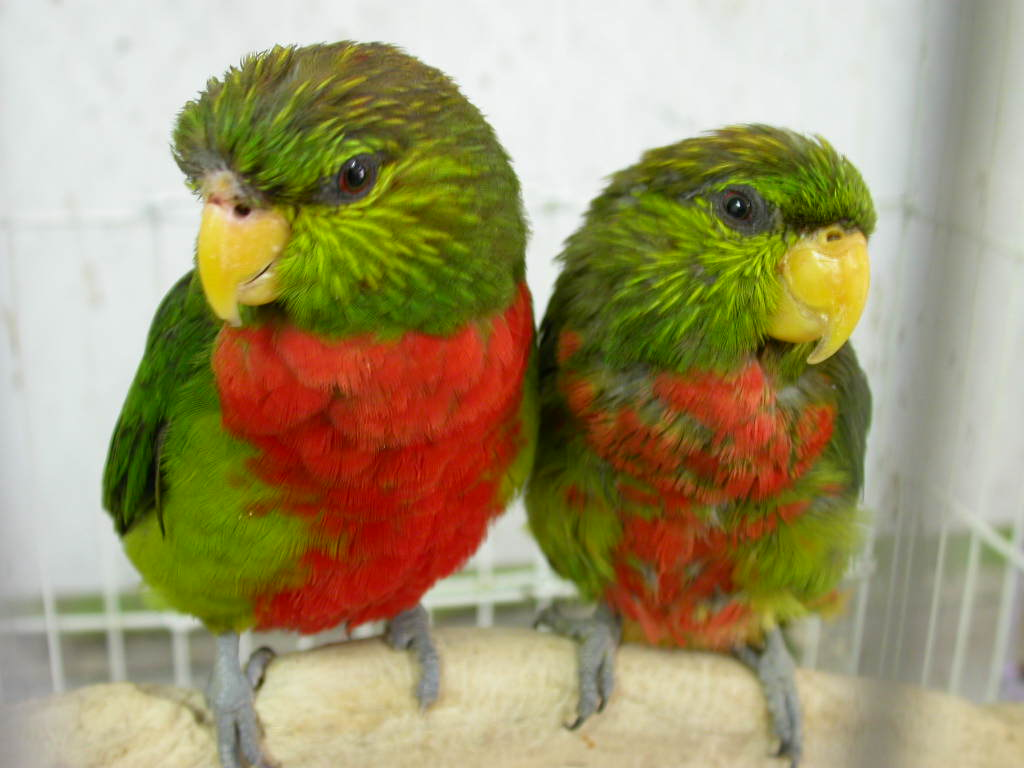
- Yellow-billed lorikeet

Scientific classification
- Kingdom: Animalia
- Phylum: Chordata
- Class: Aves
- Order: Psittaciformes
- Family: Psittaculidae
- Tribe: Loriini
- Genus: Neopsittacus; Salvadori, 1875

Type species
- Nanodes musschenbroekii Schlegel, 1871

Species
- Two; see text

= Neopsittacus =

Genus of birds

Neopsittacus is a genus of parrot in the family Psittaculidae. The genus contains two species, both of which are native to New Guinea.

== Taxonomy ==
The genus Neopsittacus contains two species and several subspecies:

Genus Neopsittacus – Salvadori, 1875 – two species
Common name	Scientific name and subspecies	Range	Size and ecology	IUCN status and estimated population
Yellow-billed lorikeet	Neopsittacus musschenbroekii (Schlegel, 1871) Two subspecies: Neopsittacus musschenbroekii major Neumann 1924; Neopsittacus musschenbroekii musschenbroekii (Schlegel 1871)	New Guinea	Size: Habitat: Diet:	LC
Orange-billed lorikeet	Neopsittacus pullicauda Hartert, 1896 Three subspecies: Neopsittacus pullicauda alpinus Ogilvie-Grant 1914; Neopsittacus pullicauda pullicauda Hartert 1896; Neopsittacus pullicauda socialis Mayr 1931	New Guinea	Size: Habitat: Diet:	LC
