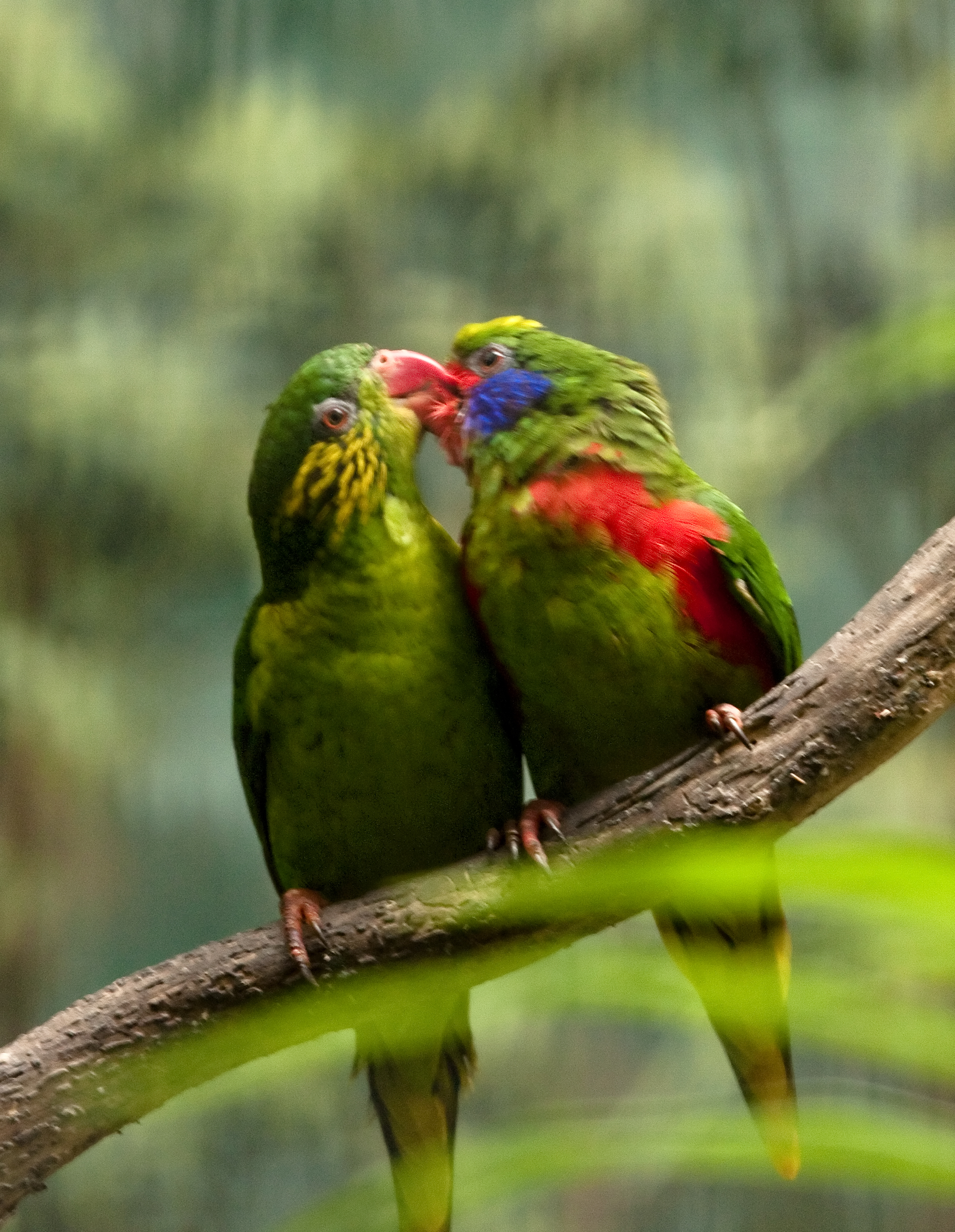
- A pair, female on left and male on right at Jurong Bird Park

Conservation status
- Least Concern (IUCN 3.1)

Scientific classification
- Kingdom: Animalia
- Phylum: Chordata
- Class: Aves
- Order: Psittaciformes
- Family: Psittaculidae
- Genus: Hypocharmosyna
- Species: H. placentis

Binomial name
- Hypocharmosyna placentis (Temminck, 1835)

= Red-flanked lorikeet =

Species of bird

The red-flanked lorikeet (Hypocharmosyna placentis) is a species of parrot in the family Psittaculidae. It is found in Mollucas, New Guinea and the Bismarck Archipelago. Its natural habitats are subtropical or tropical moist lowland forests and subtropical or tropical mangrove forests. Only the adult males have the red plumage on the head and sides.

== Taxonomy ==
This species was formerly placed in the genus Charmosyna. It was moved to the resurrected genus Hypocharmosyna based on a molecular phylogenetic study published in 2020.

Five subspecies are recognised:

- H. p. intensior (Kinnear, 1928) – North Maluku, Gebe Island
- H. p. ornata (Mayr, 1940) – north-western New Guinea, west Papuan Islands
- H. p. pallidior (Rothschild & Hartert, E, 1905) – Woodlark Island, Bismarck Archipelago, Bougainville Island, western Solomon Islands
- H. p. placentis (Temminck, 1835) – South Maluku, Aru Islands, southern New Guinea
- H. p. subplacens (Sclater, PL, 1876) – eastern New Guinea
