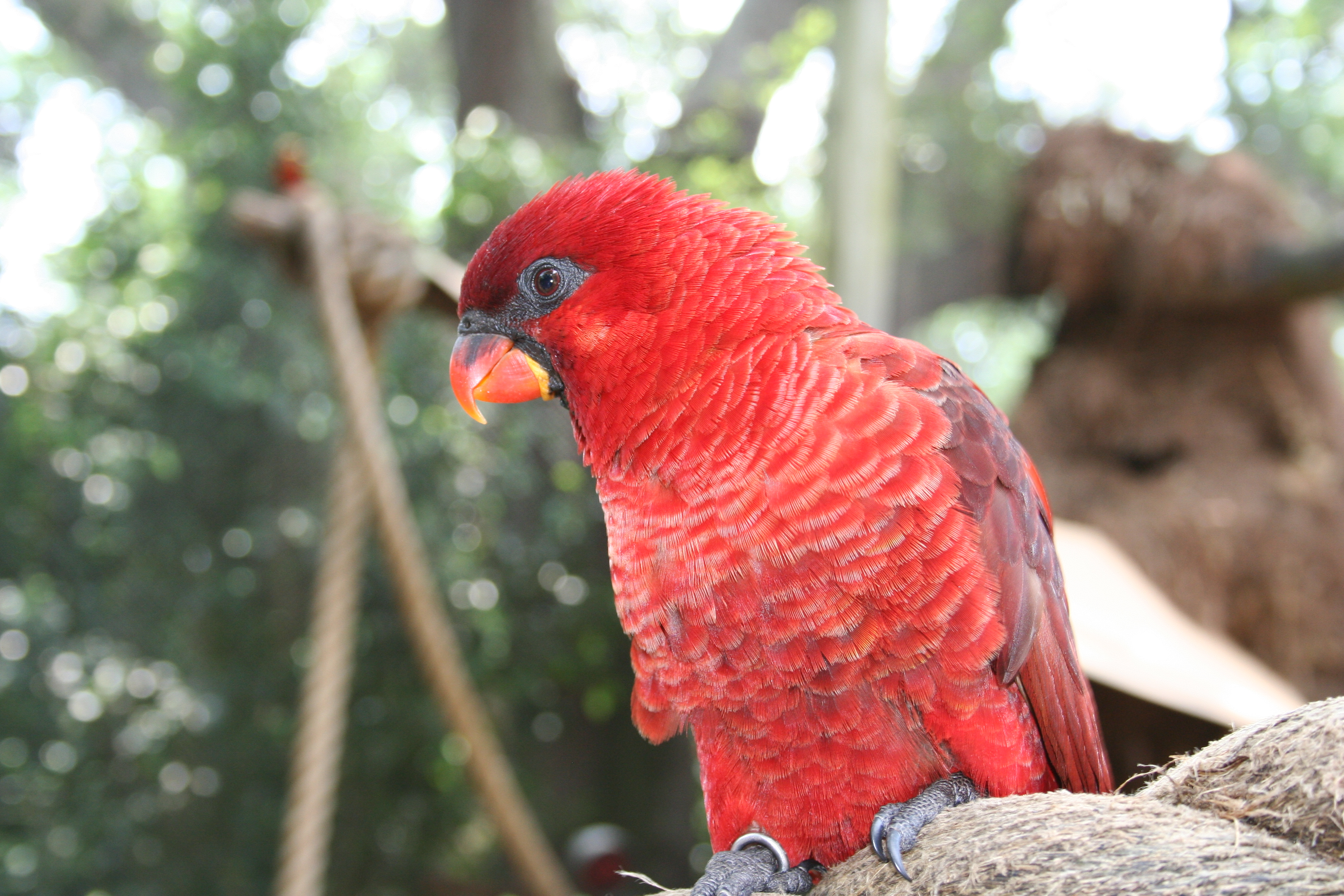
- At Busch Gardens, Tampa Bay, USA

Conservation status
- Least Concern (IUCN 3.1)

Scientific classification
- Kingdom: Animalia
- Phylum: Chordata
- Class: Aves
- Order: Psittaciformes
- Family: Psittaculidae
- Genus: Chalcopsitta
- Species: C. cardinalis

Binomial name
- Chalcopsitta cardinalis (Gray, 1849)

Synonyms
- Pseudeos cardinalis

= Cardinal lory =

Species of bird

The cardinal lory (Chalcopsitta cardinalis) is a species of parrot in the family Psittaculidae. The cardinal lory lives mainly in the mangrove and the lowland forests of the Solomon Islands, Bougainville Island and easternmost islands of the Bismarck Archipelago. It was previously placed in the genus Pseudeos.

It prefers Syzygium species and other fruit-bearing trees that have red blossoms.

== Description ==
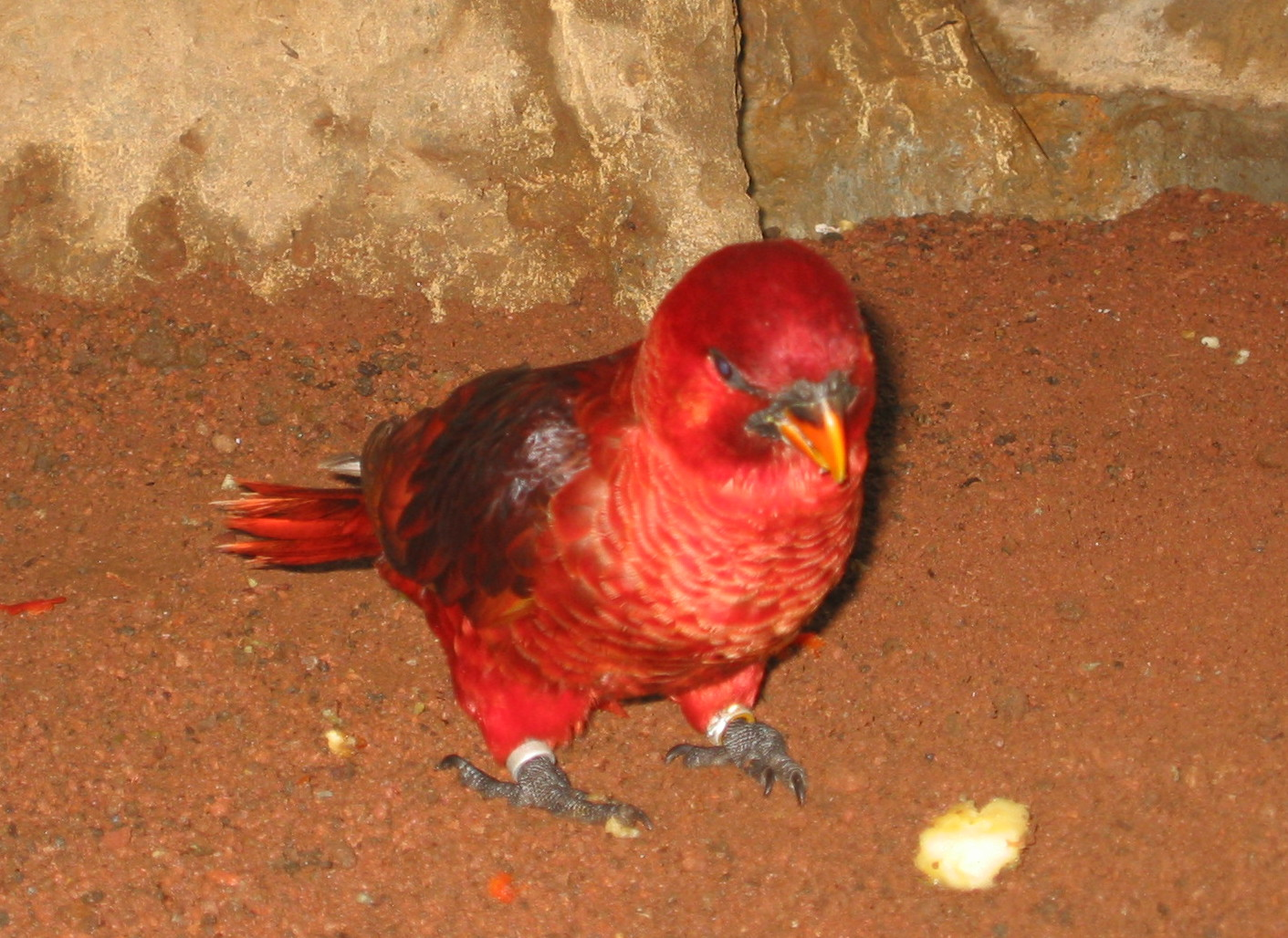
At Loro Parque, Spain

The cardinal lory is 31 cm (12 in) long. All plumage is red. The beak is orange with black at its base. The bare skin at base of beak and around eyes is black, and the irises are orange-red. Its legs are grey. The male and female are identical in external appearance. The beaks of the juveniles are dull orange with more prominent black areas than the adults, pale grey eye-rings, and yellow irises.

== Aviculture ==
In 1989, the Solomon Islands permitted a few cardinal lories to be exported to the United States. However, because of the Wild Bird Conservation Act in 1992, the exportation of cardinal lories from the Solomon Islands to the US was banned except for approved breeding.
