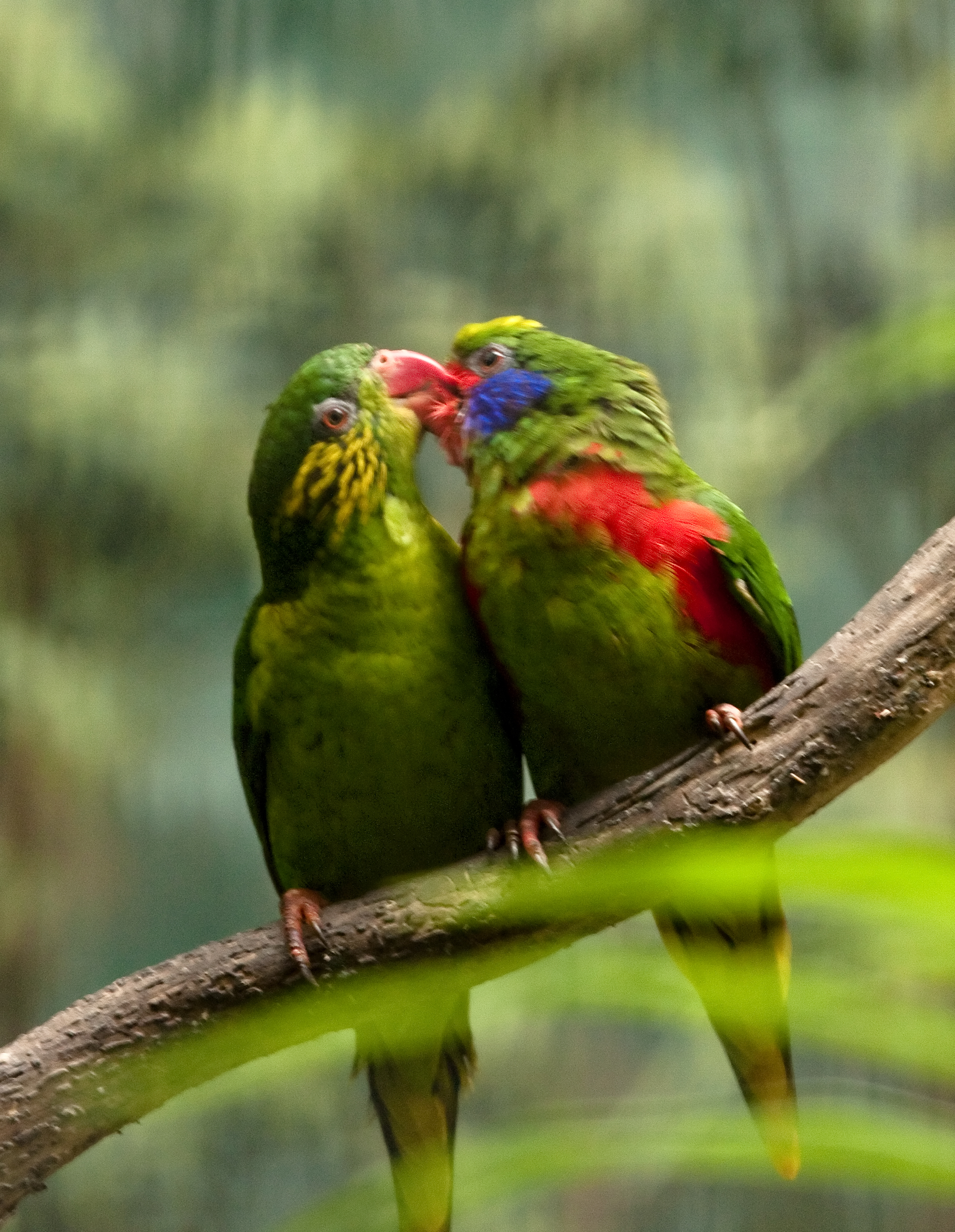
- Red-flanked lorikeets

Scientific classification
- Kingdom: Animalia
- Phylum: Chordata
- Class: Aves
- Order: Psittaciformes
- Family: Psittaculidae
- Tribe: Loriini
- Genus: Hypocharmosyna; Salvadori, 1891

Type species
- Psittacus placentis Red-flanked lorikeet Temminck, 1834

= Hypocharmosyna =

Genus of birds

Hypocharmosyna is a genus of parrots in the family Psittaculidae that are endemic to New Guinea, the Maluku Islands and the Bismarck Archipelago.

== Taxonomy ==
The genus Hypocharmosyna was introduced in 1891 by the Italian zoologist Tommaso Salvadori with the red-flanked lorikeet as the type species. The genus was formerly considered as a junior synonym of the genus Charmosyna but following the publication of a molecular phylogenetic study in 2020, Hypocharmosyna was resurrected for two species belonging to a clade that was deeply divergent from other members of Charmosyna.

The genus contains two species:

- Red-fronted lorikeet (Hypocharmosyna rubronotata)
- Red-flanked lorikeet (Hypocharmosyna placentis)
