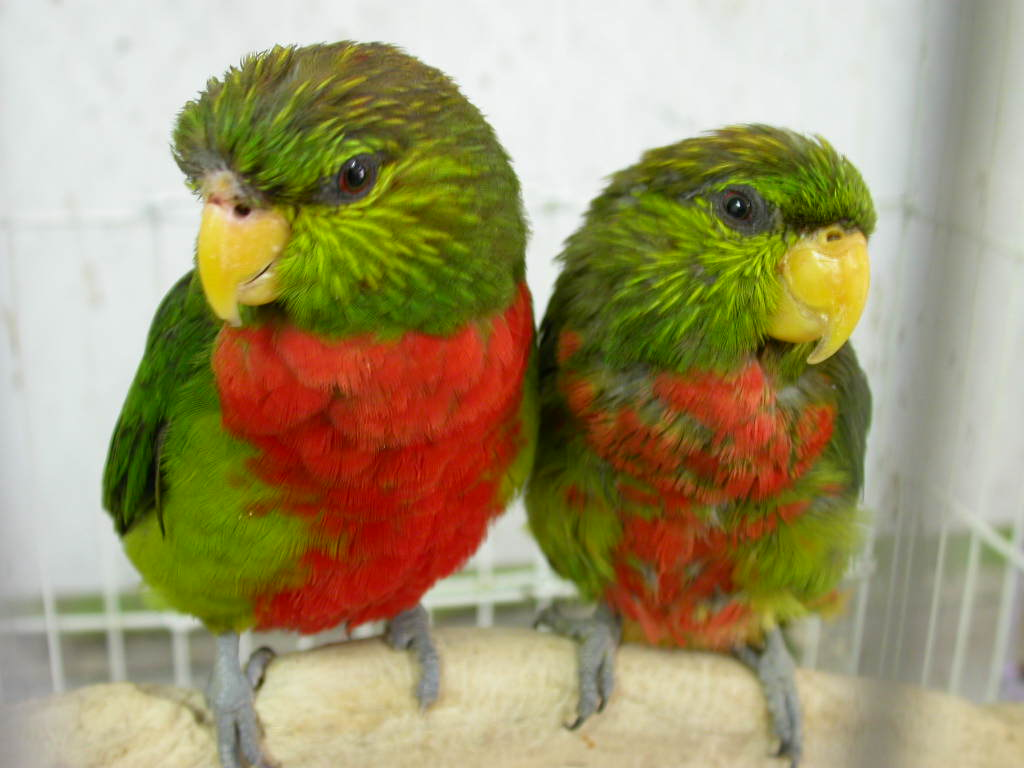

Conservation status
- Least Concern (IUCN 3.1)

Scientific classification
- Kingdom: Animalia
- Phylum: Chordata
- Class: Aves
- Order: Psittaciformes
- Family: Psittaculidae
- Genus: Neopsittacus
- Species: N. musschenbroekii

Binomial name
- Neopsittacus musschenbroekii (Schlegel, 1871)

= Yellow-billed lorikeet =

Species of bird

The yellow-billed lorikeet (Neopsittacus musschenbroekii) is a species of parrot in the family Psittaculidae. It is found in New Guinea. Its natural habitat is subtropical or tropical moist montane forests.

== Description ==
The yellow-billed lorikeet has green plumage with a red breast and a bright yellow bill.
