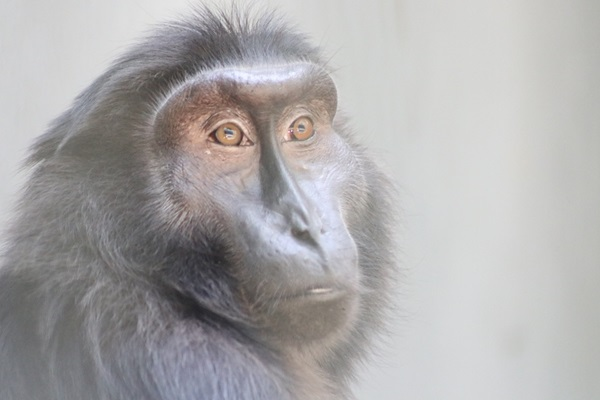

Conservation status
- Vulnerable (IUCN 3.1)

Scientific classification
- Kingdom: Animalia
- Phylum: Chordata
- Class: Mammalia
- Order: Primates
- Family: Cercopithecidae
- Genus: Macaca
- Species: M. hecki

Binomial name
- Macaca hecki (Matschie, 1901)
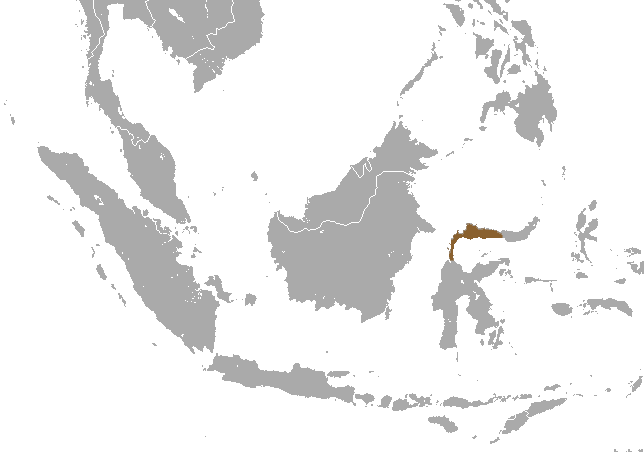
- Heck's macaque range

= Heck's macaque =

Species of Old World monkey

Heck's macaque (Macaca hecki) is a macaque of Sulawesi, Indonesia. This Old World monkey is diurnal.

Heck's macaques live within groups of 10 to 15 individuals in home ranges of 100 hectares. The males leave the group they are born in when they become sexually mature and join other groups to avoid inbreeding. Although capable of climbing trees, Heck's Macaques spend most of their time on the ground looking for flowers, tubers, sprouts, insects, mollusks, and sometimes small vertebrates to consume.
