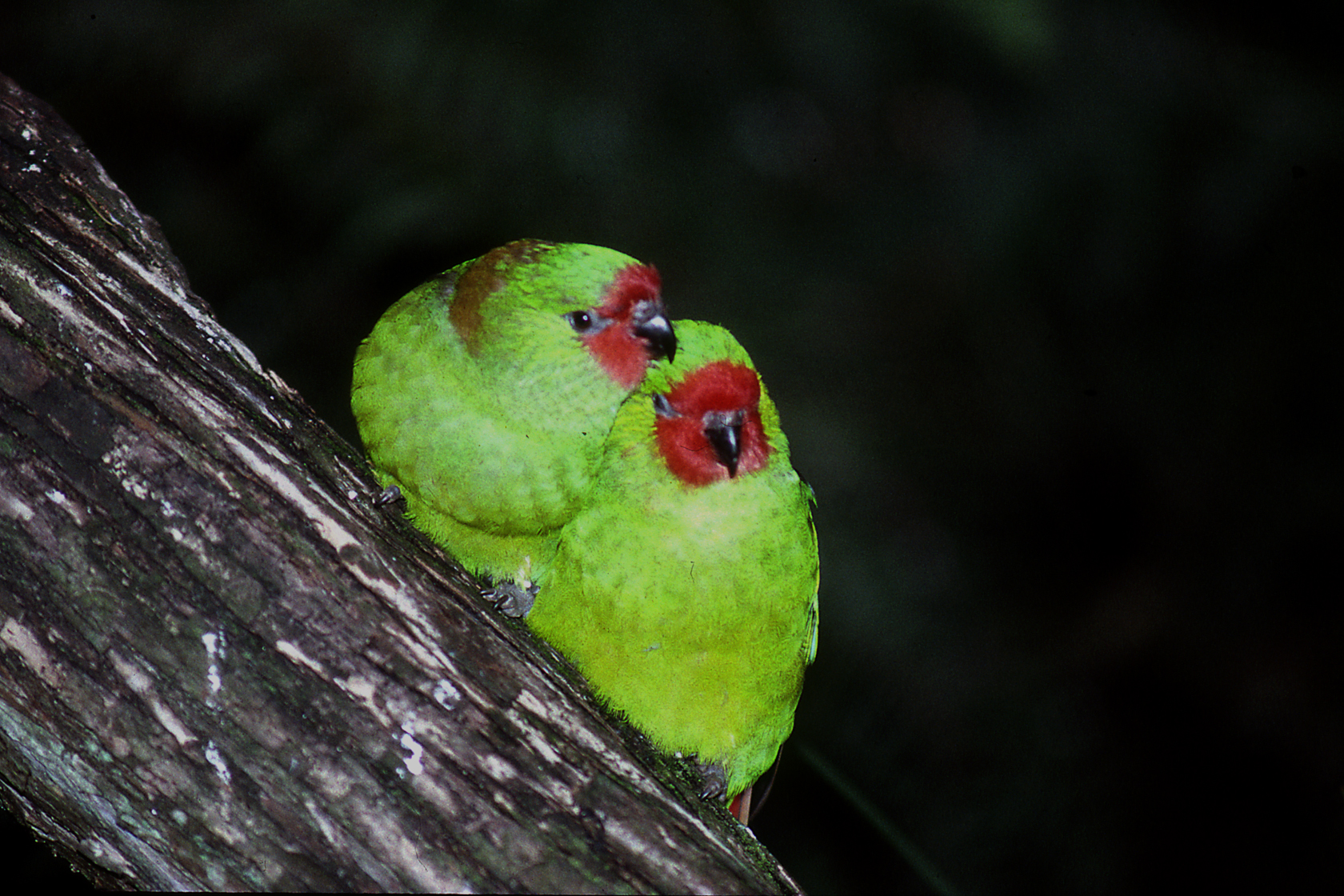
- Parvipsitta pusilla

Scientific classification
- Kingdom: Animalia
- Phylum: Chordata
- Class: Aves
- Order: Psittaciformes
- Family: Psittaculidae
- Tribe: Loriini
- Genus: Parvipsitta; Mathews, 1916

Species
- Two; see text

= Parvipsitta =

Genus of birds

Parvipsitta is a parrot genus of in the family Psittaculidae. They are native to Australia. The group was previously placed in the genus Glossopsitta. There are two species.

== Species ==
Genus Parvipsitta – Mathews, 1916 – two species
Common name	Scientific name and subspecies	Range	Size and ecology	IUCN status and estimated population
Purple-crowned lorikeet	Parvipsitta porphyrocephala (Dietrichsen, 1837)	Southern Australia including Kangaroo Island	Size: 15 cm (5.9 in) long. Dark purple crown. Yellow-orange forehead and ear-coverts, deepening to orange lores. Green upperparts, tinted bronze on the mantle and nape. Chin, chest and belly are powder blue. Yellowish-green under-tail coverts and thighs. Mostly green tail. Crimson patches are present under the wings in the male and not the female. Habitat: Diet:	LC
Little lorikeet	Parvipsitta pusilla (Shaw, 1790)	Eastern and southern Australia including Tasmania although is uncommon there.	Size: 15 cm (5.9 in) long. Mainly green plumage. The crown, lores and throat are red, the nape and shoulder bronze-coloured. The underparts yellow-tinged. The bill is black and the iris golden in colour. Habitat: Diet:	LC
