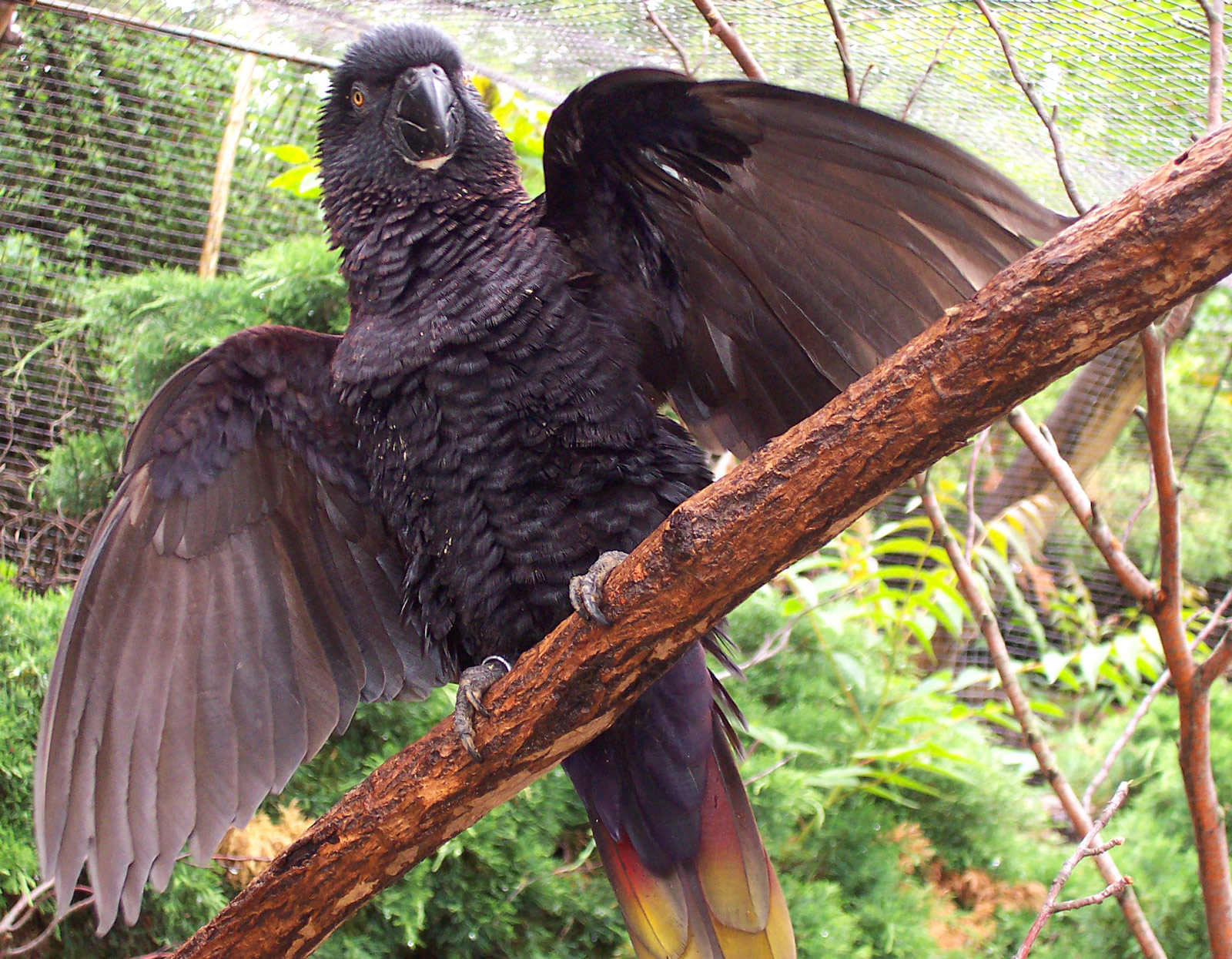
- Black lory at Prague Zoo

Scientific classification
- Kingdom: Animalia
- Phylum: Chordata
- Class: Aves
- Order: Psittaciformes
- Family: Psittaculidae
- Tribe: Loriini
- Genus: Chalcopsitta; Bonaparte, 1850

Type species
- Psittacus ater Black lory Scopoli, 1786

Synonyms
- Pseudeos Peters, J.L., 1935

= Chalcopsitta =

Genus of birds

Chalcopsitta is a genus of parrot in the family Psittaculidae and the subfamily Loriinae. Four of the species are native to New Guinea and western offshore islands. The name Chalcopsitta is derived from the Greek khalkos meaning "bronze" and psitta meaning "parrot".

== Description ==
The five species of the genus Chalcopsitta are about 31 – 32 cm (13 in) long. They have long tails, and prominent bare skin at the base of the lower mandible. Males and females have similar external appearance, and juveniles have duller plumage with more marked bare eye-rings.

== Taxonomy ==
The genus Chalcopsitta was introduced in 1850 by the French naturalist Charles Lucien Bonaparte. The name combines the Ancient Greek khalkos meaning "bronze" with the Modern Latin psitta meaning "parrot". The type species was designated by George Robert Gray in 1855 as the black lory.

=== Species ===
The genus contains five species:

Image	Common name	Scientific name	Distribution
	Dusky lory	Chalcopsitta fuscata	New Guinea, including Salawati (Raja Ampat Islands, off western New Guinea) and Yapen (Cenderawasih Bay, off northwestern New Guinea)
	Cardinal lory	Chalcopsitta cardinalis	lowlands of Bismarck Archipelago and Solomon Islands
	Brown lory	Chalcopsitta duivenbodei	northern New Guinea
	Black lory	Chalcopsitta atra	Raja Ampat Islands (northwest of New Guinea) and Bird's Head Peninsula (northwest New Guinea)
	Yellow-streaked lory	Chalcopsitta scintillata	south New Guinea and satellites

== Cited texts ==
- Collar N (1997) "Family Psittacidae (Parrots)" in Handbook of the Birds of the World Volume 4; Sandgrouse to Cuckoos (eds del Hoyo J, Elliott A, Sargatal J) Lynx Edicions:Barcelona. ISBN 84-87334-22-9
- Forshaw, Joseph M. (2006). Parrots of the World; an Identification Guide. Illustrated by Frank Knight. Princeton University Press. ISBN 0-691-09251-6.
