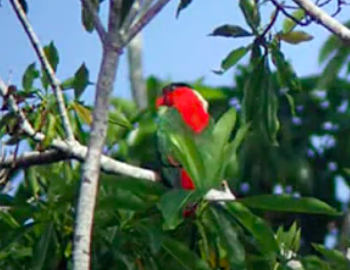

Conservation status
- Near Threatened (IUCN 3.1)

Scientific classification
- Kingdom: Animalia
- Phylum: Chordata
- Class: Aves
- Order: Psittaciformes
- Family: Psittaculidae
- Genus: Lorius
- Species: L. albidinucha

Binomial name
- Lorius albidinucha (Rothschild & Hartert, 1924)

Synonyms
- Lorius albidinuchus (Rothschild & Hartert, 1924)

= White-naped lory =

Species of bird

The white-naped lory (Lorius albidinucha) is a monotypic species of parrot in the family Psittaculidae.

== Description ==
The white-naped lory is 26 cm (10 in) long. It is mostly red with black on top of head and white on back of neck. It has green wings, and a narrow yellow transverse line on each side of body below neck. It has dark-grey legs. It has an orange-red beak, dark-grey eyerings, and orange-yellow pupils.

== Distribution and habitat ==
It is endemic to central and southern New Ireland in Papua New Guinea. Its natural habitats are subtropical or tropical moist lowland forest and subtropical or tropical moist montane forest. It is threatened by habitat loss. The species is only rarely documented, with a specific ornithological expedition to the Hans Meyer Range obtaining the first audio recordings in 2026.

== Cited texts ==
- Forshaw, Joseph M. (2006). Parrots of the World; an Identification Guide. Illustrated by Frank Knight. Princeton University Press. ISBN 0-691-09251-6.
