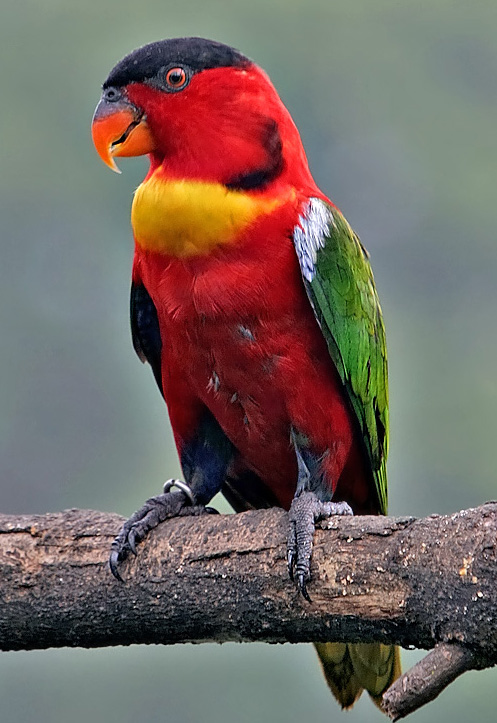

Conservation status
- Least Concern (IUCN 3.1)

Scientific classification
- Kingdom: Animalia
- Phylum: Chordata
- Class: Aves
- Order: Psittaciformes
- Family: Psittaculidae
- Genus: Lorius
- Species: L. chlorocercus

Binomial name
- Lorius chlorocercus Gould, 1856

= Yellow-bibbed lory =

Species of parrot

The yellow-bibbed lory (Lorius chlorocercus) is a species of parrot in the family Psittaculidae. It is endemic to the southern Solomon Islands.

== Description ==
The yellow-bibbed lory is 28 cm (11 in) long. It is mostly red with black on top of the head and green wings. It has a yellow transverse band on the upper chest and a crescent-shaped black patch on each side of the neck. It has blue/green thighs and dark grey legs. It has an orange-red beak, dark grey eyerings, and orange irises. Under its wings the bird has blue feathers.

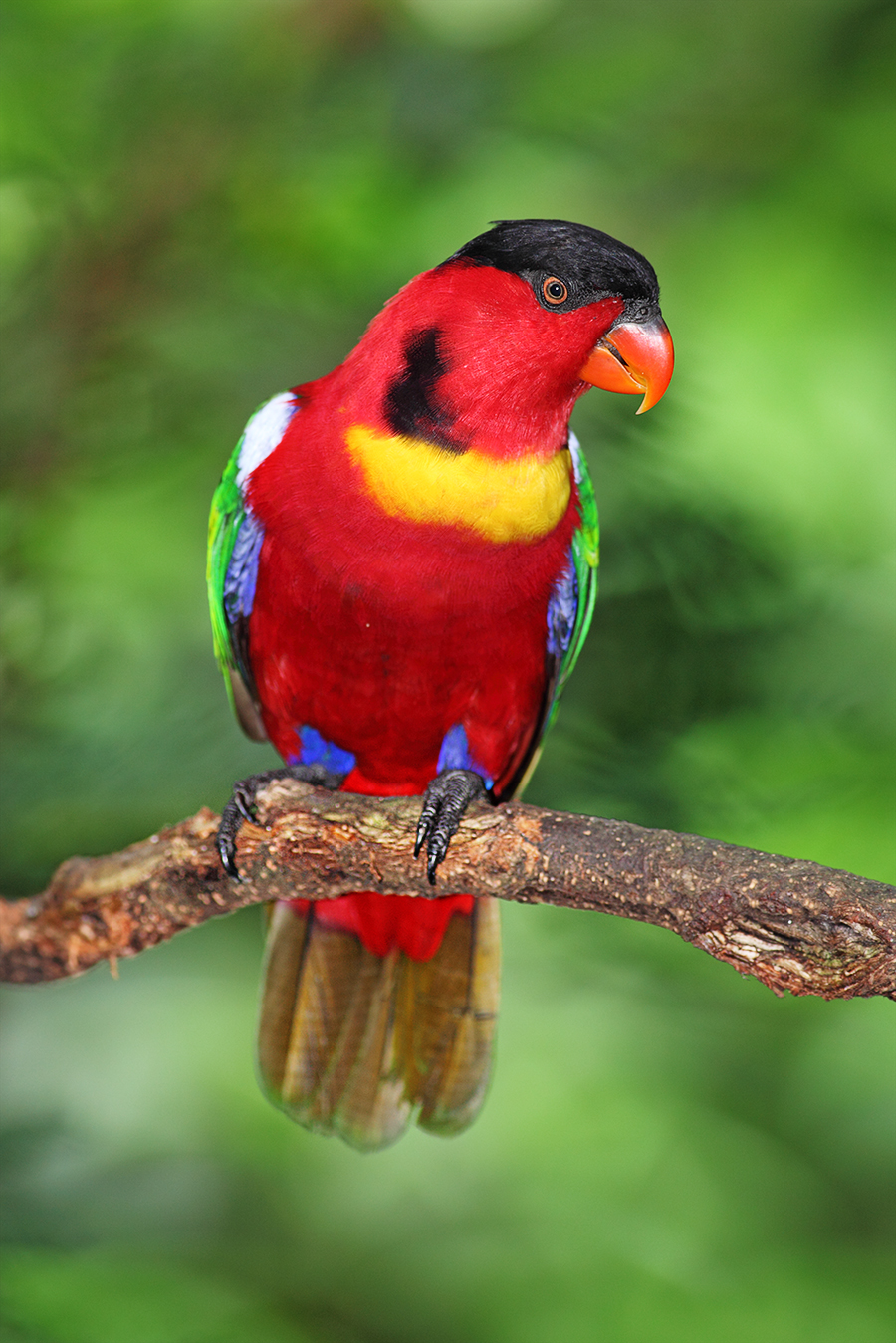
Front

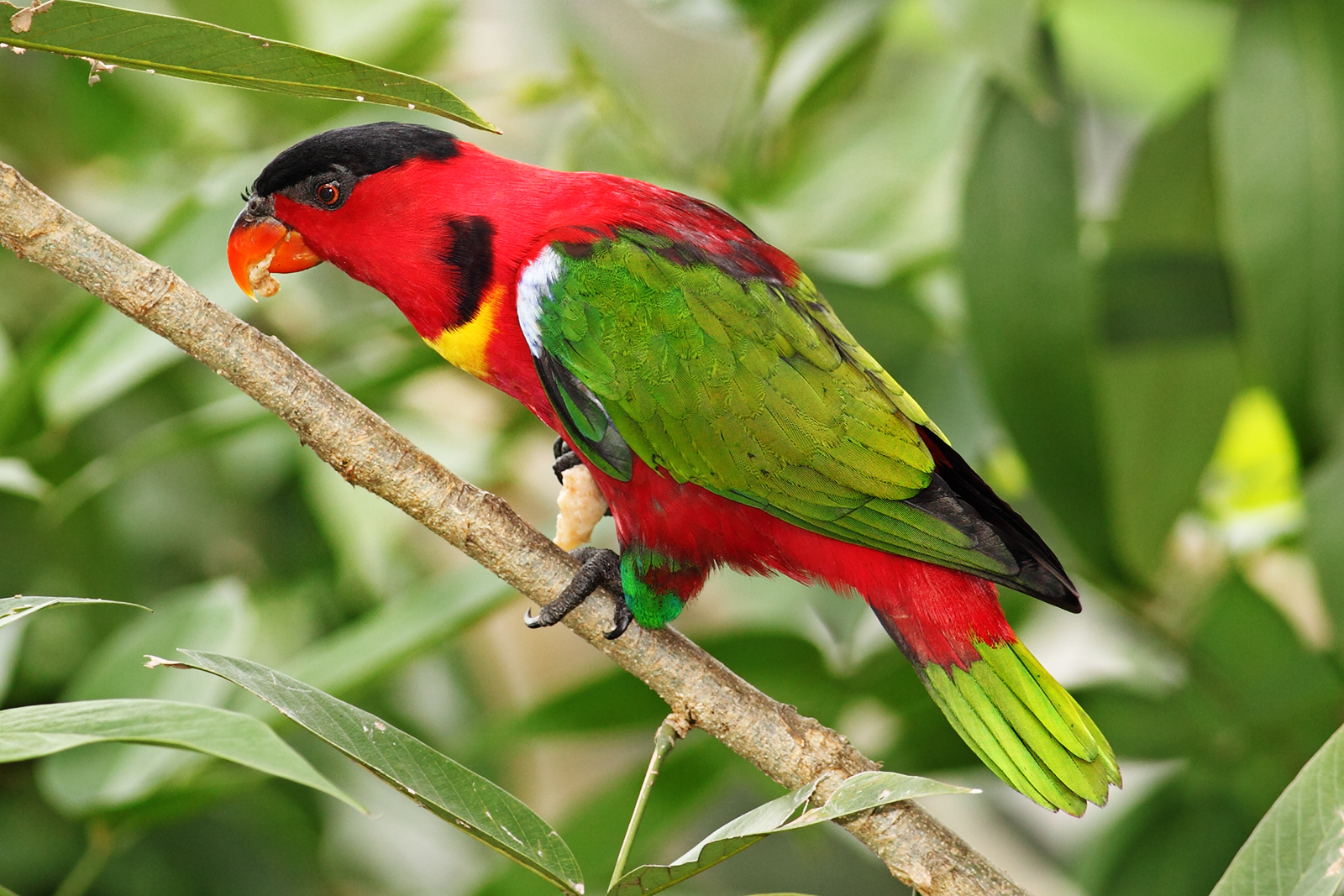
Side view

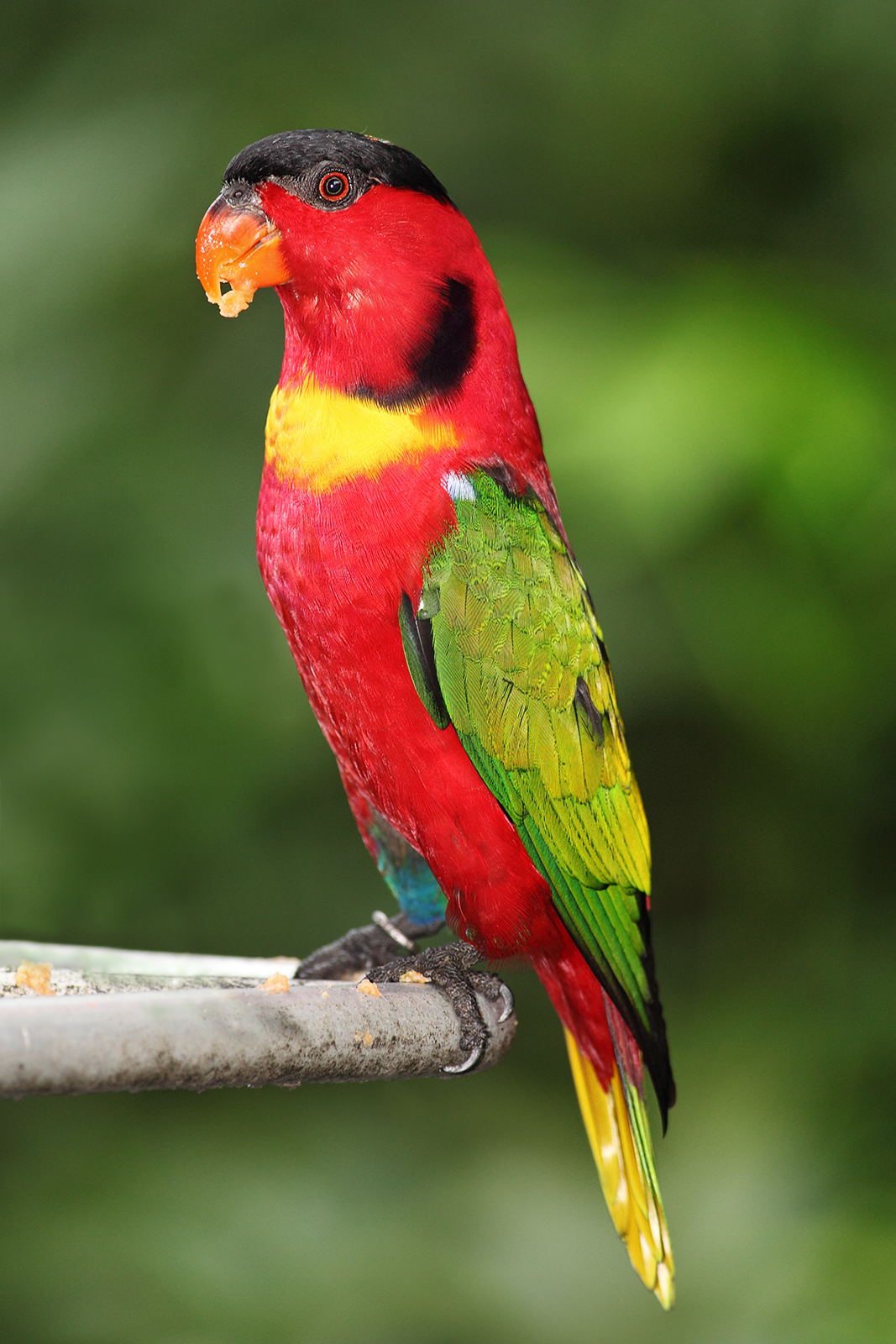
Side view

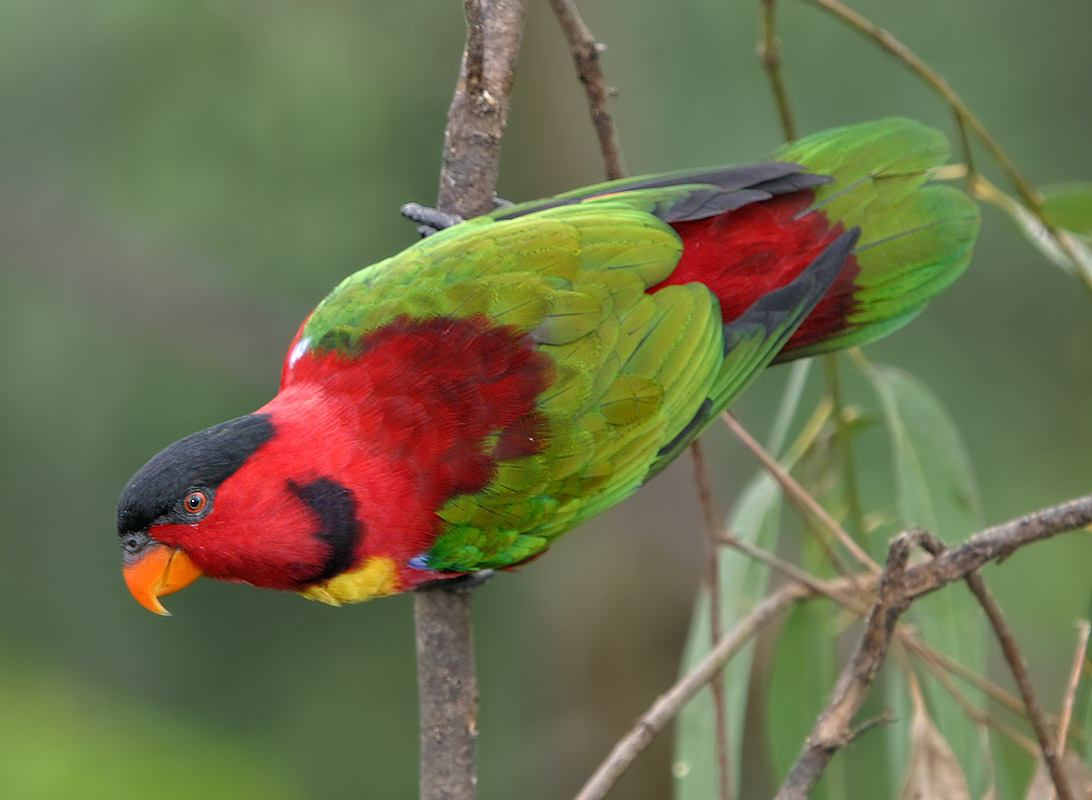
From above

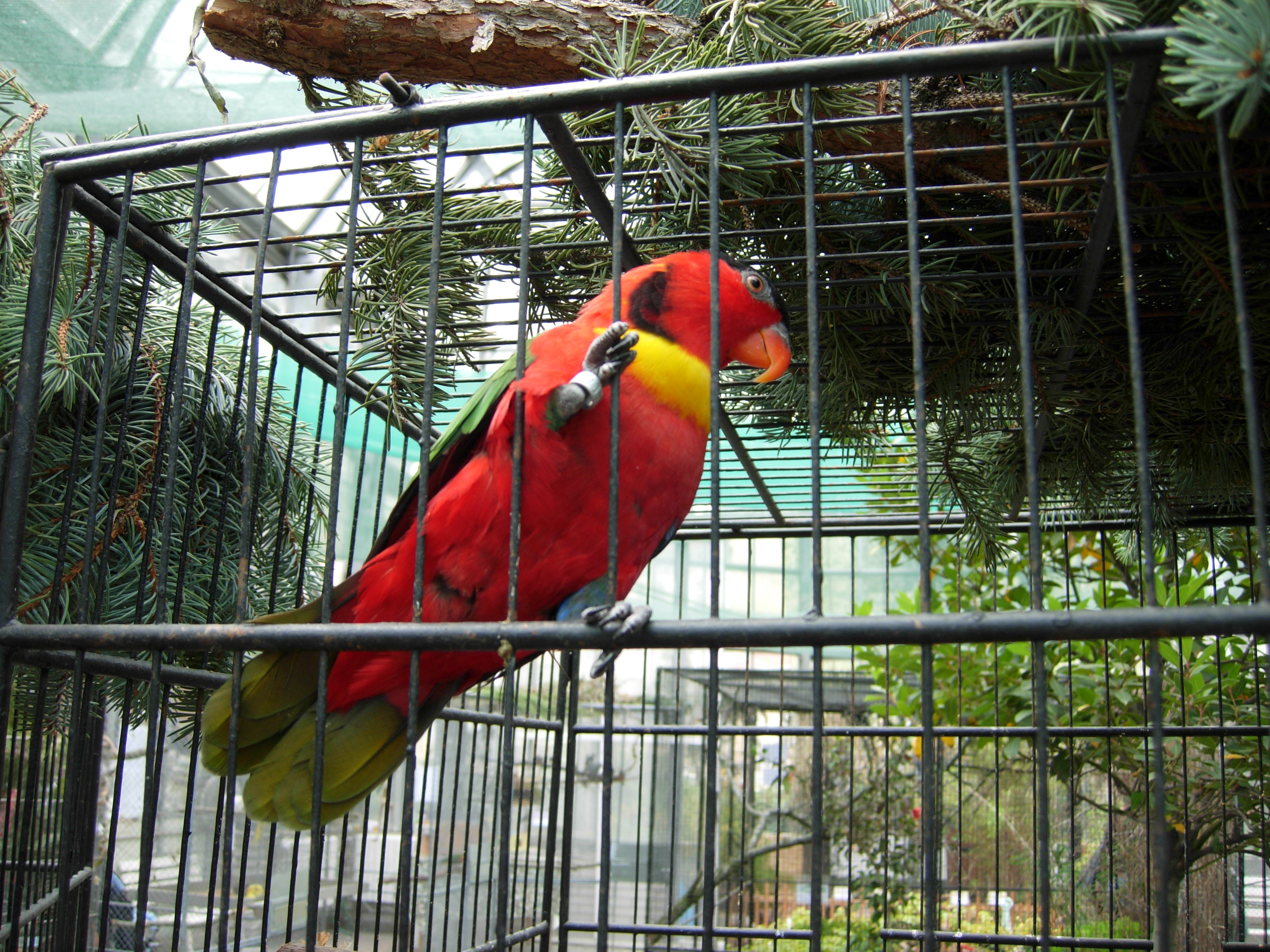
Underside

== Range and habitat ==
The yellow-bibbed lory is endemic to the eastern Solomon Islands. Its natural habitats are subtropical or tropical moist lowland forest and subtropical or tropical moist montane forest.

== Relationship with humans ==
Yellow-bibbed Lories mimic a wide range of sounds, including the human voice, in other words they are 'talking parrots'. Providing a permit is obtained, it is exempt from export prohibition under the Solomon Islands Wildlife Protection and Management Act (1998)

== Cited texts ==
- Forshaw, Joseph M. (2006). Parrots of the World; an Identification Guide. Illustrated by Frank Knight. Princeton University Press. ISBN 0-691-09251-6.
