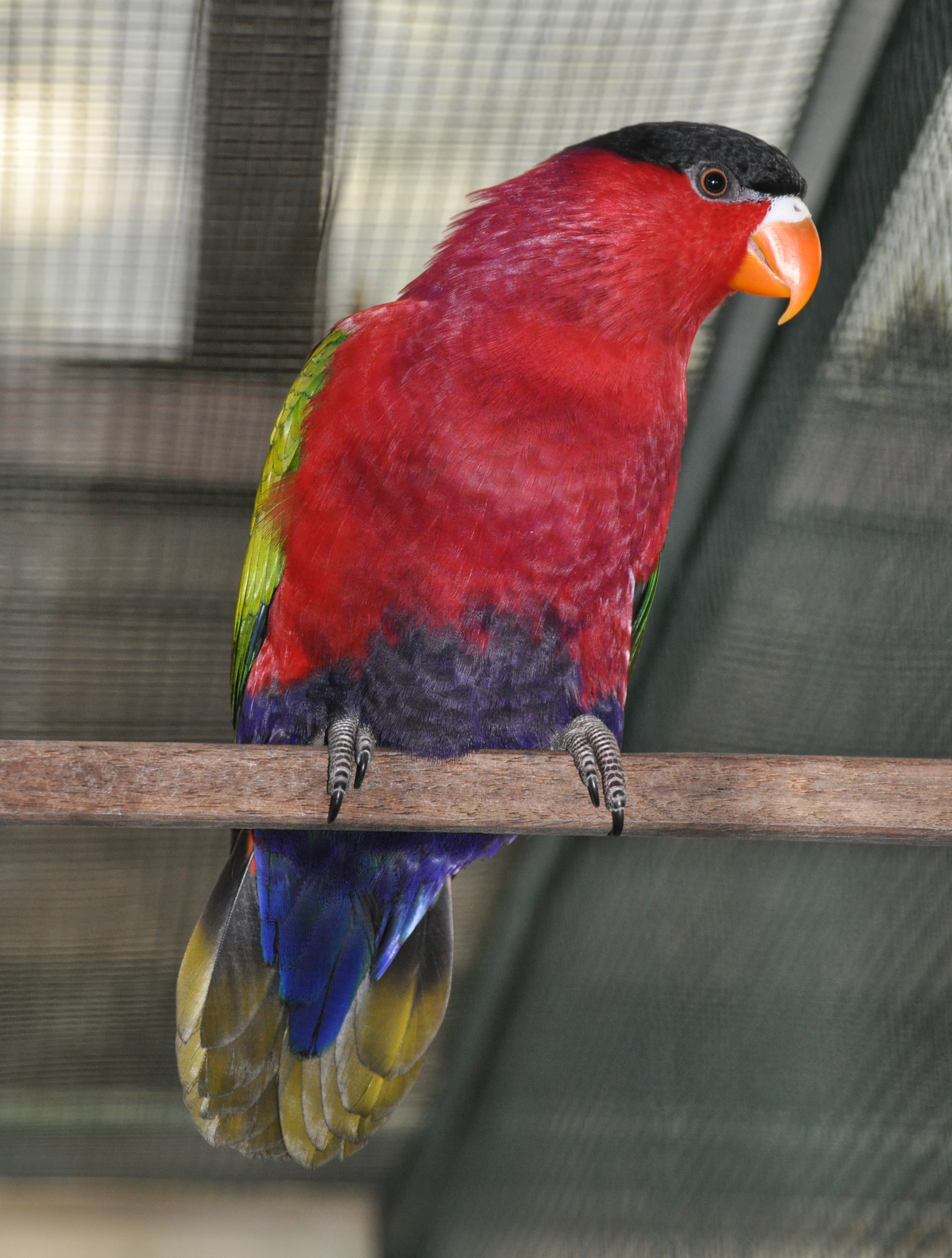
- At Walsrode Bird Park, Germany

Conservation status
- Least Concern (IUCN 3.1)

Scientific classification
- Kingdom: Animalia
- Phylum: Chordata
- Class: Aves
- Order: Psittaciformes
- Family: Psittaculidae
- Genus: Lorius
- Species: L. hypoinochrous

Binomial name
- Lorius hypoinochrous Gray, 1859

Synonyms
- Lorius amabilis

= Purple-bellied lory =

Species of bird

The purple-bellied lory (Lorius hypoinochrous) is a species of parrot in the family Psittaculidae. It is endemic to Papua New Guinea. It is found in south-east New Guinea, the Bismarck Archipelago, the d'Entrecasteaux Islands, the Louisiade Archipelago, the Trobriand Islands and Woodlark Island.

Its natural habitats are subtropical or tropical moist lowland forest, subtropical or tropical mangrove forests, and subtropical or tropical moist montane forest.

== Description ==
The purple-bellied lory is 26 cm (10 in) long. It is mostly red with black on top of head, green wings, and purple underparts. Its thighs are purple and its legs are dark grey. Its tail is red with dark green-blue at the tip. Its cere is white. The eyerings are grey and the irises are orange-red. The three subspecies differ with slightly different plumage colours.

== Taxonomy ==
The species contains three subspecies:

- Lorius hypoinochrous Gray, GR 1859
  - Lorius hypoinochrous devittatus Hartert 1898
  - Lorius hypoinochrous hypoinochrous Gray, GR 1859
  - Lorius hypoinochrous rosselianus Rothschild & Hartert 1918

== Cited texts ==
- Forshaw, Joseph M. (2006). Parrots of the World; an Identification Guide. Illustrated by Frank Knight. Princeton University Press. ISBN 0-691-09251-6.
