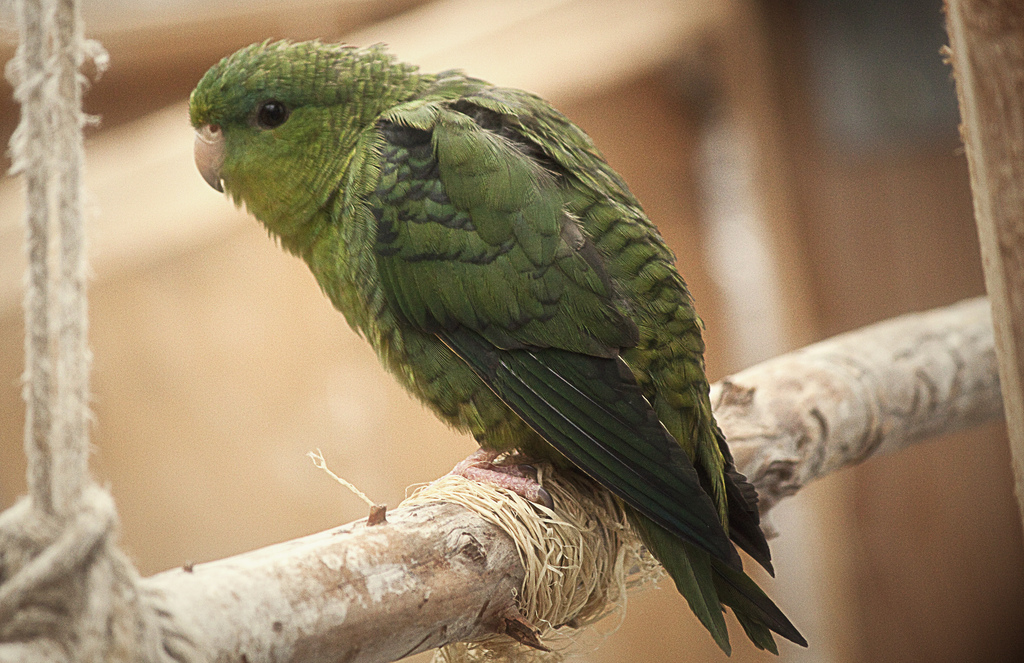

Conservation status
- Least Concern (IUCN 3.1)

Scientific classification
- Kingdom: Animalia
- Phylum: Chordata
- Class: Aves
- Order: Psittaciformes
- Family: Psittacidae
- Genus: Bolborhynchus
- Species: B. lineola

Binomial name
- Bolborhynchus lineola (Cassin, 1853)

Subspecies
- B. l. lineola (Cassin 1853); B. l. tigrinus (Souance 1856)

= Barred parakeet =

Species of bird

The barred parakeet (Bolborhynchus lineola), also known as the lineolated parakeet (commonly nicknamed the "linnie") or the Catherine parakeet, is a small psittaciforme bird found in the highland forests of tropical Latin America. Its plumage is mostly green, with multiple black or dark green stripes and bars and a pale, peach-colored bill. The darker stripes vary in prominence and intensity between the two subspecies. Several color mutations (morphs) are available in aviculture, as it has become a popular captive bird species.

The species has a disjunct distribution, found from southern México south through Panamá; in South America, it is found both in the Santa Marta Mountains of Colombia and the Venezuelan Coastal Range, as well as the forests of the Andean foothills (from western Venezuela south to Perú and Bolivia).

== Taxonomy ==
There are two subspecies of the barred parakeet:

- B. l. lineola (Cassin 1853)
- B. l. tigrinus (Souance 1856) – tigrinus (meaning 'tiger'), as this subspecies has more prominent dark striping

== Description ==
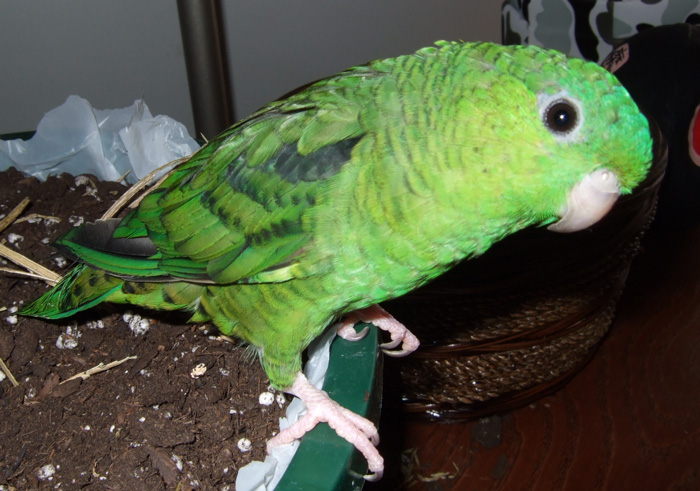
A natural coloured pet linnie

The barred parakeet is about 16 cm (6.5 in) in length and has a weight of about 42 to 52 grams. It is mostly green and has black stripes (or bars) over its upper-parts, except on the top of the head. Its lower-parts are olive-green with very dark green stripes on its sides. The shoulder of its wings is black, there is some blue on the under-side of its wings, and its tail is dark green. The irises are dark brown, the beak is horn coloured, and the legs are pink. Juveniles have less-marked dark stripes, which darken with age. Males and females are generally similar in external appearance, but males may sometimes have more marked black stripes than the female. Usually, however, there is no discerning trait to differentiate sex and sexing must be done surgically or through blood tests. The two subspecies differ in the prominence of the dark stripes.

== Habitat and status ==
Their habitat is the forests and mountains up to an elevation of roughly 3,300 m (2.1 mi) above sea level. They spend some of their time on the ground, but sleep high in the trees. They are tolerant of cold and have been seen taking snow baths.

The barred parakeet has a large population that is thought to be stable.

== Behavior and breeding ==
There are usually two to four eggs in a clutch, which hatch after about 18–21 days of incubation. Chicks leave the nest at about five weeks after hatching.

Lineolated parakeets are found in the wild in groups of 6–30, although bigger groups (up to 150 birds) are known. They eat fruit, dried and germinated seeds, and insect larvae.

Lineolated parakeets are known for their calm dispositions and peculiar postures. Unlike many birds, lineolateds typically rest in a near horizontal position with their heads almost in line with their tails. They are generally very calm birds and typically mumble quietly, and their calls are not high-pitched or piercing to the ear. They do not demand constant attention, and when properly raised they can become calm, confident, and deeply bonded companions.

== Aviculture ==
Barred parakeets are popular as pets because of their quiet and even-tempered disposition, and also because many colour mutations are available. Green series birds include the normal green (wild type), dark green, olive, and the green series ino called lutino (yellow). Turquoise series birds include turquoise, cobalt, mauve, and the turquoise ino called creamino (white). Greywing, where the barring and overall color is diluted, is another mutation that can fall on any color mutation, even the inos. Violet, misty, and cinnamon types are seen in European aviculture, but rare in the United States. Their average lifespan is about 10 years, but individual birds have been known to live up to 15 years. They are talented mimics of human speech.

One of the most recognizable and entertaining characteristics of barred parakeets is that they enjoy bathing and being misted with water. Barred parakeets notably enjoy these mist baths; they will hang upside down and open their wings eagerly. Pet linnies are also known to have a unique trait of liking to burrow or hide in or under clothing for hours on end, and will sometimes fall asleep in their found hiding places.

Colour mutations

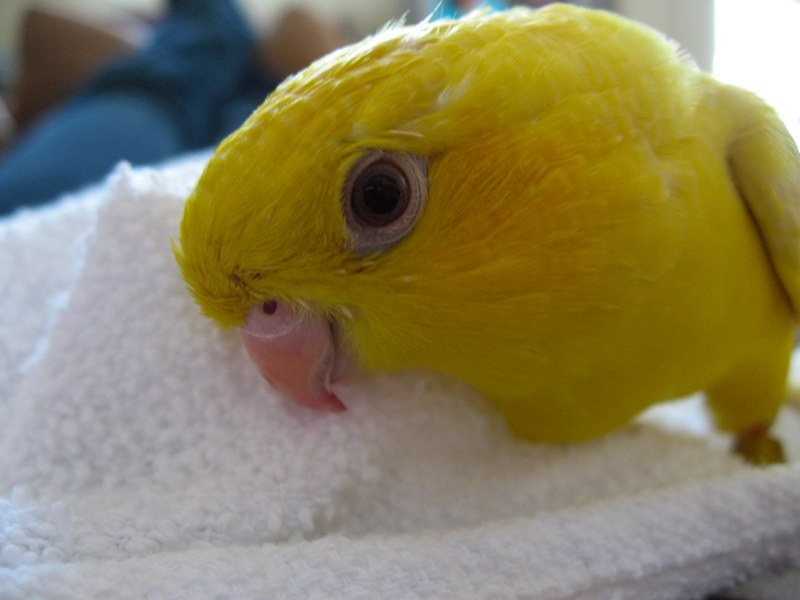
Lutino

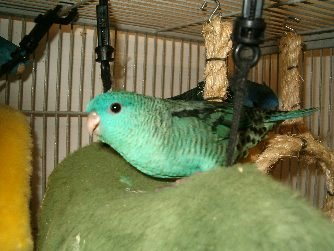
Turquoise

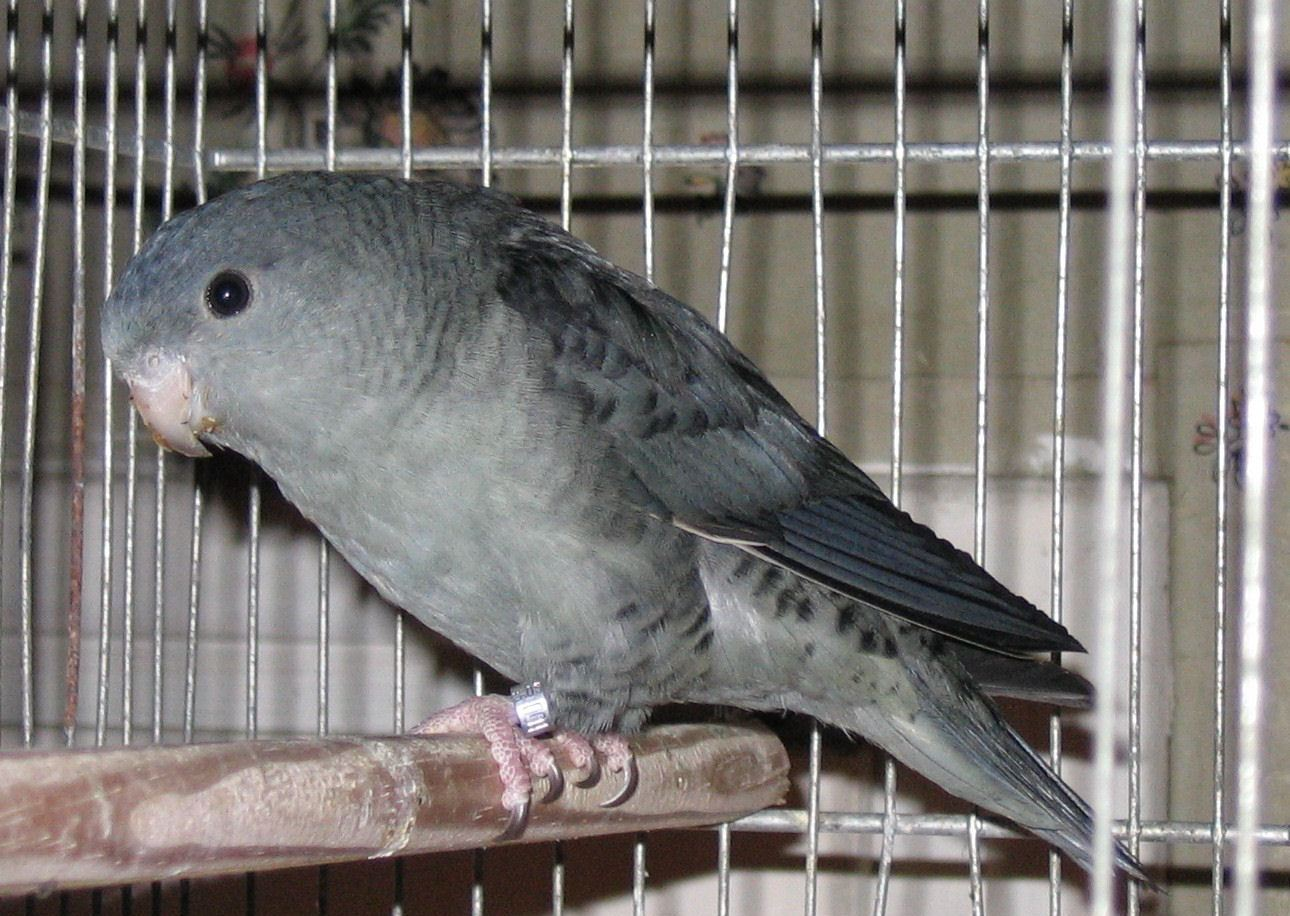
Grey/Mauve

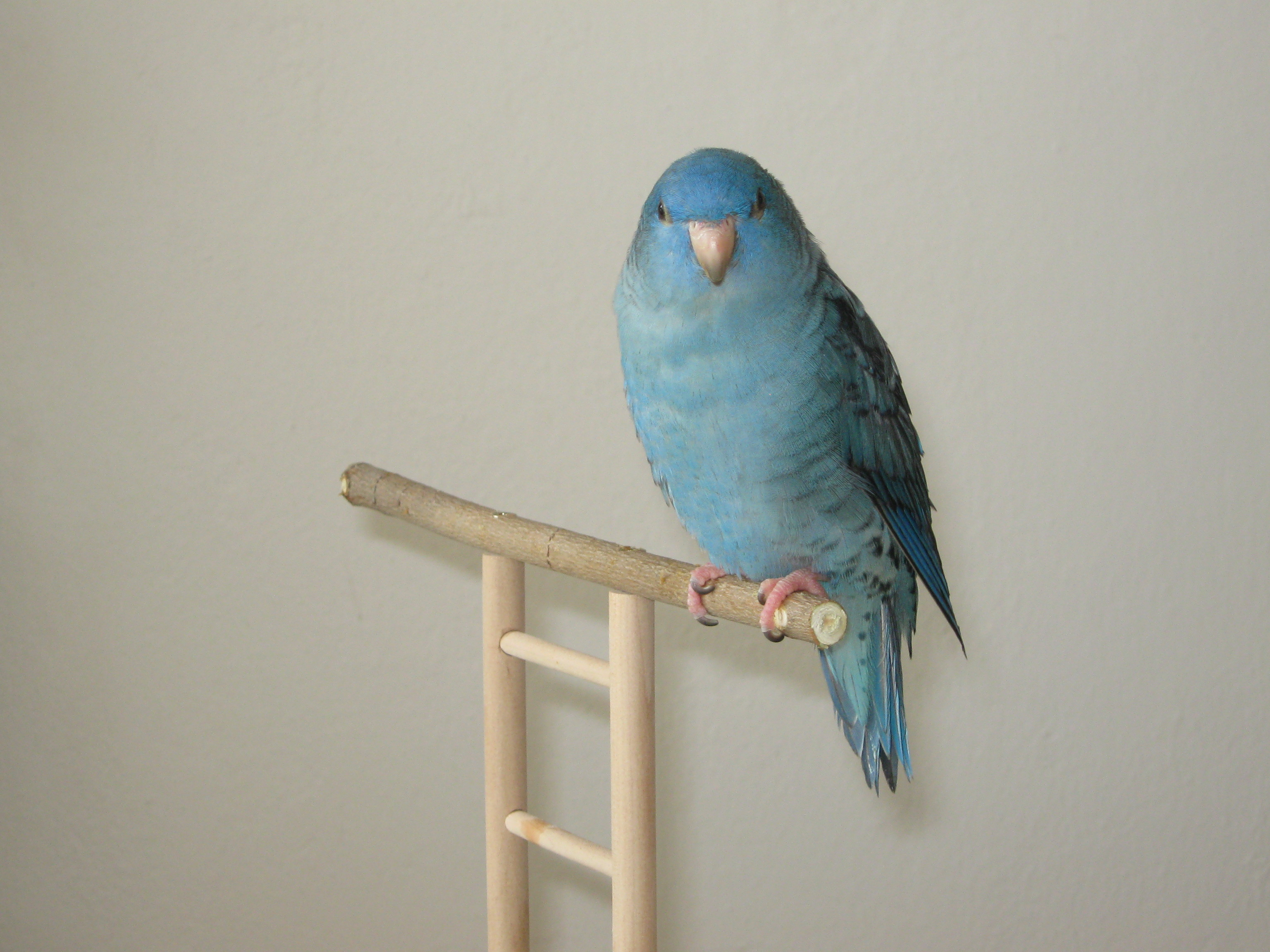
Blue/Cobalt

=== Learning to talk ===
Lineolated parakeets are known for their soft chatter and low noise levels, making them ideal apartment pets. They can sometimes make louder noises, but this is normally due to distress or their food dish running low.

These birds are also known for their ability to talk and imitate noises. Not all individuals will speak, and normally the male of the species is more vocal; but there are ways to increase the chance of a bird learning words or sounds, including:

Starting when the birds are young. Normally they learn the most words while they are less than two years old or moved into a new environment.
Using imitation games, which start by rewarding the bird after it imitates a noise that the bird is already known to make and then moving on to words or noises once the bird has caught on to the game.
Saying phrases in an excited noise or when the bird is in an excited state.
Having the bird spend time with a bird that is a known talker, especially if it is the same species.

Sometimes they will mimic a specific person's tone, normally the person they spend the most time with. They might additionally learn to imitate noises that are undesirable for them to repeat. Unwanted vocalizations can be minimised by not rewarding the bird with laughter or attention, or redirecting by getting the bird to perform another known trick.

=== Food for pets ===
Pellets are an ideal base for not only lineolated parakeets, but for many other pet birds as well, as they contain many of the essential vitamins and nutrients the birds need. Seeds should be fed as a branch of the diet but not as a staple, as a seed-based diet can cause obesity, malnutrition, and kidney failure. Green-leaved vegetables such as kale, collard greens, and turnip greens, as well as broccoli, carrot, and cauliflower, are readily consumed. Common fruits that are offered include banana, papaya, apple, apricot, and orange. Hemp, roasted soybeans, potatoes, green peas, strawberries, coconut, pumpkin seed and alfalfa, are other foods that are consumable. It is good to offer different foods to keep the diet balanced. All parrots in captivity should be encouraged to forage for their food in order to keep them from boredom and behavioural problems.

=== Toxic foods ===
Owners should avoid feeding their birds anything high in salt, sugar, and fat. Common toxic foods include avocado and guacamole, substances containing caffeine (such as tea and coffee), fruit pits and apple seeds (which contain amounts of cyanide), persimmons, onions (prolonged exposure can lead to a blood condition called hemolytic anemia), mushrooms (cause digestion problems and can induce liver failure), dried/uncooked beans (contain hemagglutinin, toxic to birds), the stems, vines, and leaves of tomatoes (the actual fruit is fine), and eggplant.

== Cited texts ==
- Forshaw, Joseph M. (2006). Parrots of the World; an Identification Guide. Illustrated by Frank Knight. Princeton University Press. ISBN 0-691-09251-6.
- Athan, Mattie Sue (2010). Guide to Companion Parrot Behavior (2nd ed.). Hauppauge, N.Y.: Barron's Educational Series. ISBN 978-0-7641-4213-0.
