= Graham Pizzey =

Australian author, photographer and ornithologist

Graham Martin Pizzey AM (4 July 1930 – 12 November 2001) was a noted Australian author, photographer and ornithologist.

== Early life and education ==
Graham Pizzey was born and grew up in grew up in East Ivanhoe on the Yarra River. At age seven he was given a copy of John A. Leach's 1926 An Australian Bird Book, and while attending Geelong Grammar School as a boarder he used photography to record his observations of the local countryside. After leaving school in 1948 he worked in his family's leather business, while studying part-time and publishing articles and photographs on natural history, the first appearing in 1948 in the Wild Life, whose editor Crosbie Morrison encouraged Pizzey's talent.

== Freelance ==
In 1957 Pizzey married Sue Taylor, who assisted him on field expeditions and typed his manuscripts for his numerous articles on natural history for newspapers, notably in the Melbourne Age (1954–64). Encouraged by their reception, in 1960 Pizzey resigned from the family business to become a full-time freelance writer and photographer. The couple settled eventually on the Mornington Peninsula, but traveled widely across the Nullarbor the north-west, east coast, and central Australia, even after their children were born, educating them by correspondence.

He wrote also for the Herald (1965–83) newspaper, and magazines, including many published, from 1954 to 1974, in Walkabout, and regular appearances in The Australian Women's Weekly and later in Burke’s Backyard Magazine. International journals, including National Geographic, featured his writing and pictures and he wrote and took part in some early Australian Broadcasting Commission television natural history documentaries, including the Wildlife Australia series (1962-1964) produced with the CSIRO. The series took viewers into unique Australian environments, and explored the native wildlife in these habitats.

His popular A Field Guide to the Birds of Australia, documenting 750 species, commissioned by Collins and researched and written over 15 years, and reprinted 14 times.

== Reception ==
Writing in a 1959, an unnamed Canberra Times reviewer deemed A Time to Look "A gripping book for all who are interested in the natural world, especially bird life," styling Pizzey "the well-known young Melbourne naturalist";

"The volume is illustrated beautifully by 37 pages of pictures which give about 140 entrancing views of bird life obtained only through the exercise, by the author, of superlative patience. Pizzey immerses himself in the atmosphere of the natural world and he holds that whether by way of the keeping of bees, the enjoyment of snow on high mountains, fishing thundering rivers, farming or underwater swimming in the rock pools of long stretching ocean beaches, the study of plants, astronomy or physics, or just by the appreciation of birds, life be comes richer by such immersions. This is not a story book but a free and informal commentary on bird life."

A fully revised Field Guide, illustrated in colour by Frank Knight, was a bestseller in 1997. The books and his regular contributions in mass media made him a well-known and trusted authority despite his lack of any formal scientific qualification.

== Offices ==
Pizzey joined the Royal Australasian Ornithologists Union (RAOU) in 1948 (now Birds Australia) and served on its Council 1969-1975 and its Records Appraisal Committee 1976–1979. He was also active in the Peninsula Conservation League, the Australian Conservation Foundation, and the Friends of the Museum of Victoria.

== Personal life ==
In 1991 Pizzey and his wife, Sue, moved into semi-retirement onto 40 ha. of bush and heathlands adjoining the Grampians/Gariwerd National Park near Dunkeld, Victoria, where they created wetlands and planted local vegetation to restore habitats. Paying guests were provided 'eco-accommodation' there.

In mid-2000 he was diagnosed with cancer, but nevertheless published two books, Journey of a Lifetime. Selected pieces by Australia's foremost birdwatcher and nature writer and The Australian Bird-Garden. Creating havens for native birds, and continued planning new projects. He died on 12 November 2001, and was survived by Sue and children Caroline, Sarah and Tom.

== Honours ==
In 1977 Pizzey was made a Member of the Order of Australia for services to conservation and ornithology, then in 1986 he was awarded the Australian Natural History Medallion. For his writing he twice received the Victorian Government C. J. Dennis Award, in 1981 and 1987. In 2000 he was invested with an honorary doctorate in applied science by RMIT University for his "substantial contribution to and work on Australia's natural history and its documentation". In 2005 he was posthumously awarded the John Hobbs Medal. A plaque commemorates him as the First Warden in the grounds of Coolart Wetlands and Homestead, in Somers. He was honorary ornithologist to the Australian Museum, a position he retained until his death.

== Book publications ==
- Pizzey, Graham. (1958). A Time to Look. William Heinemann Ltd: Melbourne.
- Pizzey, Graham. (1980). A Field Guide to the Birds of Australia. Collins: Sydney.
- Pizzey, Graham. (Compiler). (1983). Stories of Australian Birds. Currey O'Neil Ross: Melbourne.
- Pizzey, Graham. (Ed). (1985). A Separate Creation. Discovery of Wild Australia by Explorers and Naturalists. Currey O'Neil Ross: Melbourne.
- Pizzey, Graham. (1988). A Garden of Birds. Australian birds in Australian gardens. Viking O'Neil (Penguin Books Australia Ltd): Melbourne.
- Pizzey, Graham. (1992). Crosbie Morrison, Voice of Nature. Victoria Press: South Melbourne
- Pizzey, Graham. (1997). The Graham Pizzey & Frank Knight Field Guide to the Birds of Australia. Angus & Robertson: Sydney.
- Pizzey, Graham. (2000). Journey of a Lifetime. Selected pieces by Australia's foremost birdwatcher and nature writer. Angus & Robertson: Sydney.
- Pizzey, Graham. (2000). The Australian Bird-Garden. Creating havens for native birds. Angus & Robertson: Sydney.
- Pizzey, Graham, 'Morrison, Philip Crosbie (1900-1958), Naturalist' in Australian Dictionary of Biography, John Ritchie, ed., vol. 15 (Melbourne: Melbourne University Press, 2000), pp. 418–420.

== See also ==
- List of ornithologists
