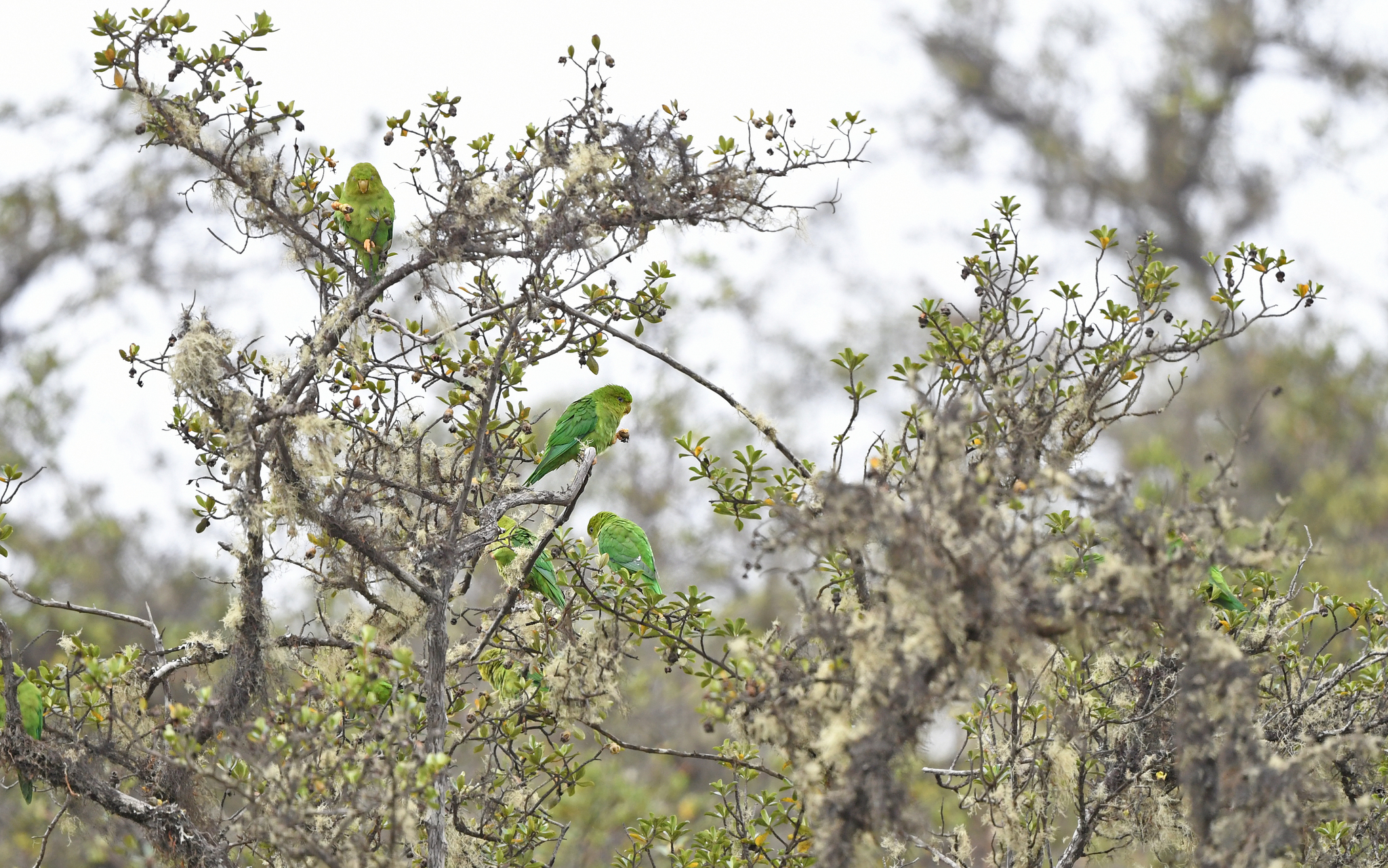

Conservation status
- Least Concern (IUCN 3.1)

Scientific classification
- Kingdom: Animalia
- Phylum: Chordata
- Class: Aves
- Order: Psittaciformes
- Family: Psittacidae
- Genus: Bolborhynchus
- Species: B. orbygnesius

Binomial name
- Bolborhynchus orbygnesius (Souancé, 1856)

Synonyms
- Bolborhynchus andicolus; Psilopsiagon aurifrons orbygnesius

= Andean parakeet =

Species of bird

The Andean parakeet (Bolborhynchus orbygnesius) is a species of bird in subfamily Arinae of the family Psittacidae, the African and New World parrots. It is found in Argentina, Bolivia, and Peru.

== Taxonomy and systematics ==
The Andean parakeet was at one time named Bolborhynchus andicolus and at other times treated as a subspecies of the mountain parakeet (Psilopsiagon aurifrons). Some authors treat it and the rufous-fronted parakeet (B. ferrugineifrons) to form a superspecies. The Andean parakeet is monotypic.

== Description ==
The Andean parakeet is 16 to 17 cm (6.3 to 6.7 in) long and weighs 48 to 50 g (1.7 to 1.8 oz). It is rather plump with a short tail. Adults are almost entirely green, with a yellow tinge from the face to the belly that is brightest on the throat and upper breast. The outer webs of their primaries are teal, sometimes approaching violet. Their bill is grayish and their legs dull pink. Juveniles do not have the yellow tinge but are otherwise the same as adults.

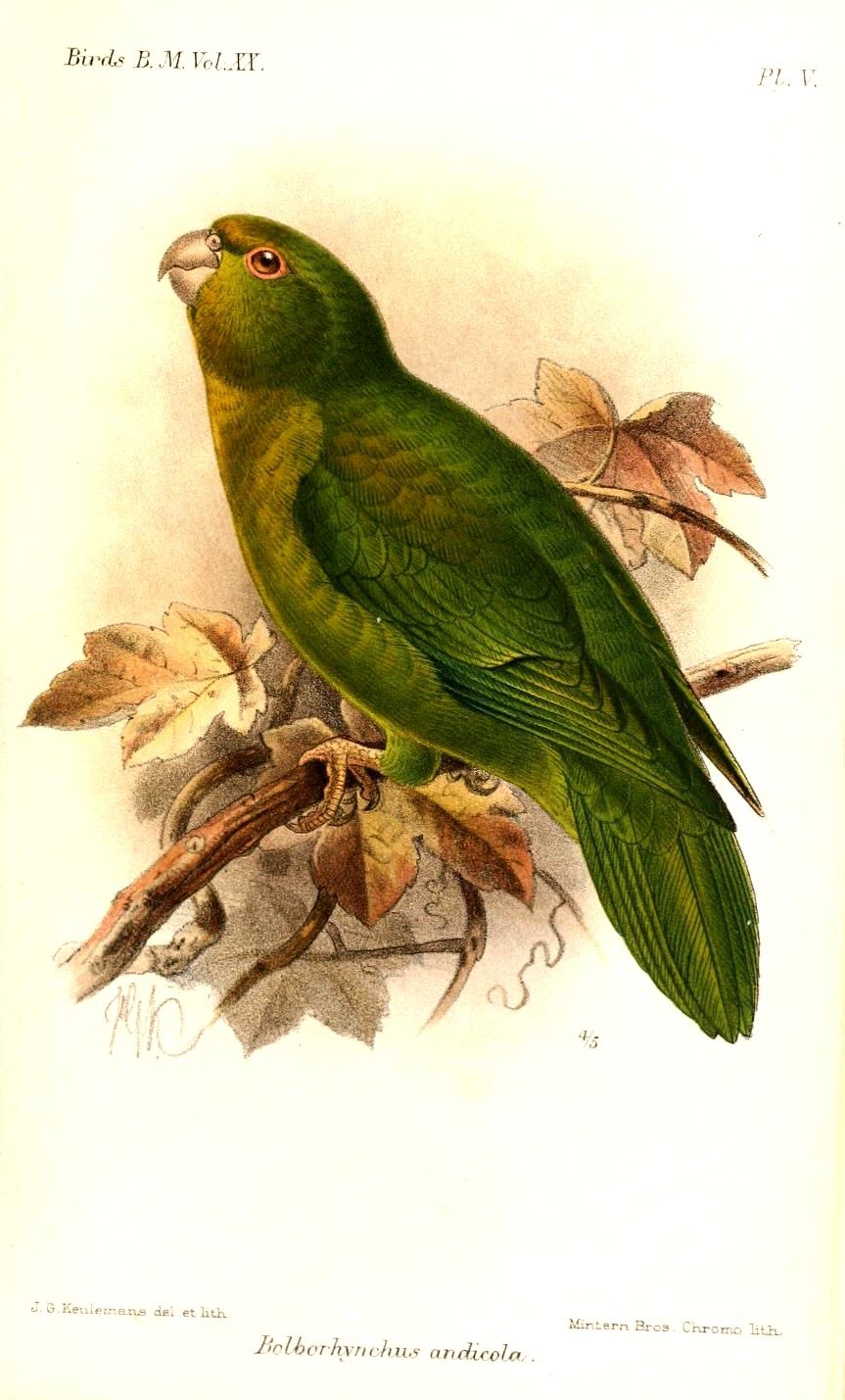
Illustration by Keulemans, 1891

== Distribution and habitat ==
The Andean parakeet is found from Peru's Department of Cajamarca south along the Andes through central Bolivia into Argentina's Jujuy and Salta provinces. It inhabits semiarid cloudforest, Polylepis woodlands, and ravines with bushy vegetation in more open country. In elevation it mostly ranges between 3,000 and 4,000 m (9,800 and 13,100 ft) but occasionally occurs past 6,000 m (20,000 ft).

== Behavior ==
=== Movement ===
The Andean parakeet moves from its core range to lower elevation valleys outside the breeding season.

=== Feeding ===
The Andean parakeet forages for seeds, fruits, and berries on the ground and in bushes, bamboo, and in leguminous trees.

=== Breeding ===
Almost nothing is known about the Andean parakeet's breeding biology. It has been reported to nest in burrows in earthern banks.

=== Vocalization ===
The Andean parakeet's usual call is "a short (irregularly overslurred) dull note, typically given in chuckling pairs or triplets "juh-juh-juh", or a much longer chattering series."

== Status ==
The IUCN has assessed the Andean parakeet as being of Least Concern. It has a fairly large range, and though its population size is not known it is believed to be stable. No immediate threats have been identified. It is locally common and flocks of up to 300 birds have been recorded.
