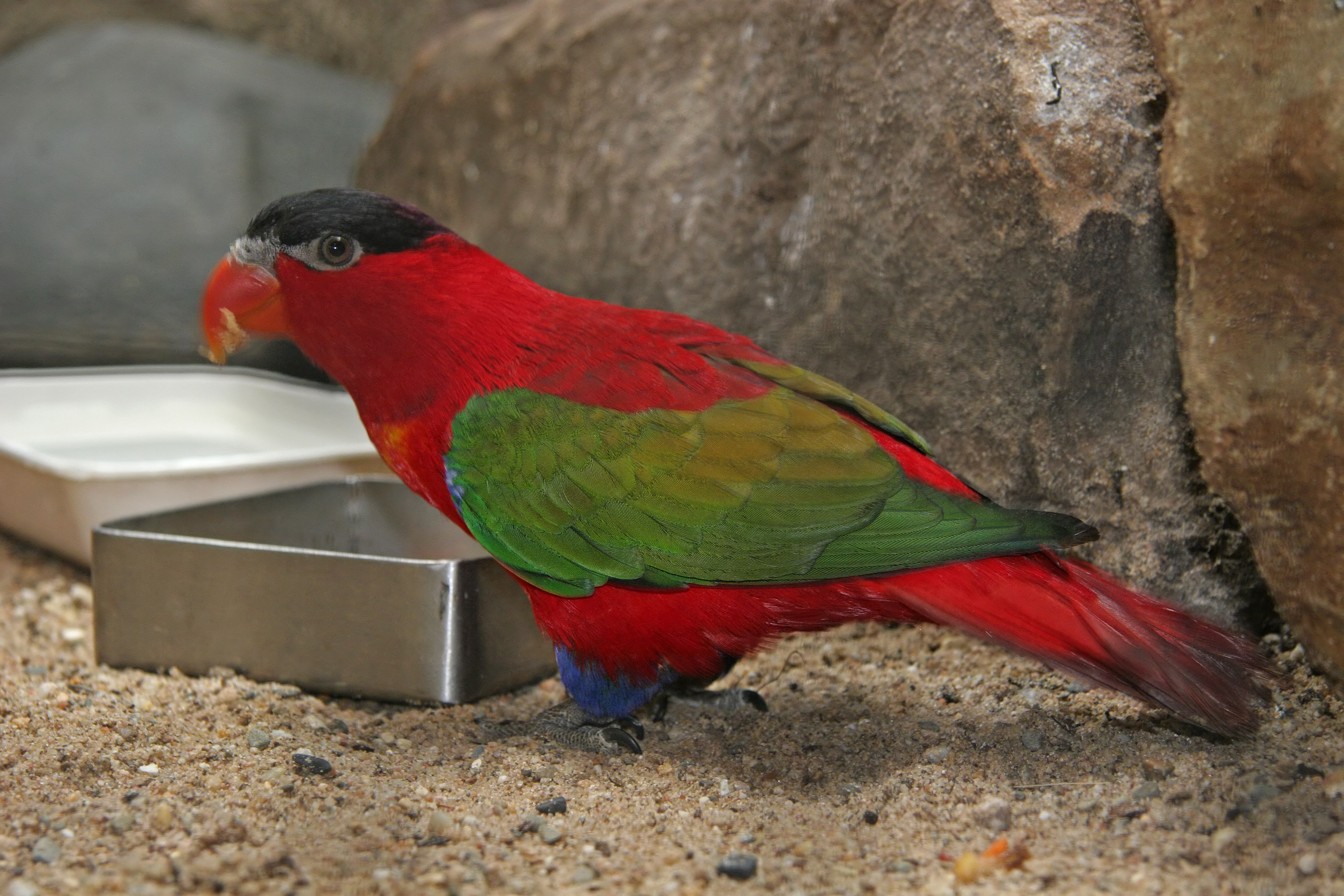
- At Natura Artis Magistra (Artis Zoo), Netherlands

Conservation status
- Endangered (IUCN 3.1)

Scientific classification
- Kingdom: Animalia
- Phylum: Chordata
- Class: Aves
- Order: Psittaciformes
- Family: Psittaculidae
- Genus: Lorius
- Species: L. domicella

Binomial name
- Lorius domicella (Linnaeus, 1758)

Synonyms
- Lorius tibialis Sclater, 1871; Psittacus domicella Linnaeus, 1758

= Purple-naped lory =

Species of bird

The purple-naped lory (Lorius domicella) is a species of parrot in the family Psittaculidae. It is forest-dwelling endemic to the islands of Seram, Ambon, and perhaps also Haruku and Saparua, South Maluku, Indonesia. It is considered endangered, the main threat being from trapping for the cage-bird trade.

== Taxonomy ==
The purple-naped lory was formally described by the Swedish naturalist Carl Linnaeus in 1758 in the tenth edition of his Systema Naturae under the binomial name Psittacus domicella. The specific epithet domicella is Medieval Latin meaning "damsel". Linnaeus based his description on "The second Black-capped Lory" that had been described and illustrated in 1751 by the English naturalist George Edwards in his book A Natural History of Uncommon Birds. The specimen had been brought to London from the East Indies and Edwards was able made a drawing of it at the home of the naturalist and collector Hans Sloane. Linnaeus specified the locality as "Asia", but this is now taken to be Ambon Island in the Maluku Islands. The purple-naped lory is now placed in the genus Lorius that was introduced in 1825 by the Irish zoologist Nicholas Aylward Vigors. The species is monotypic: no subspecies are recognised.

== Description ==
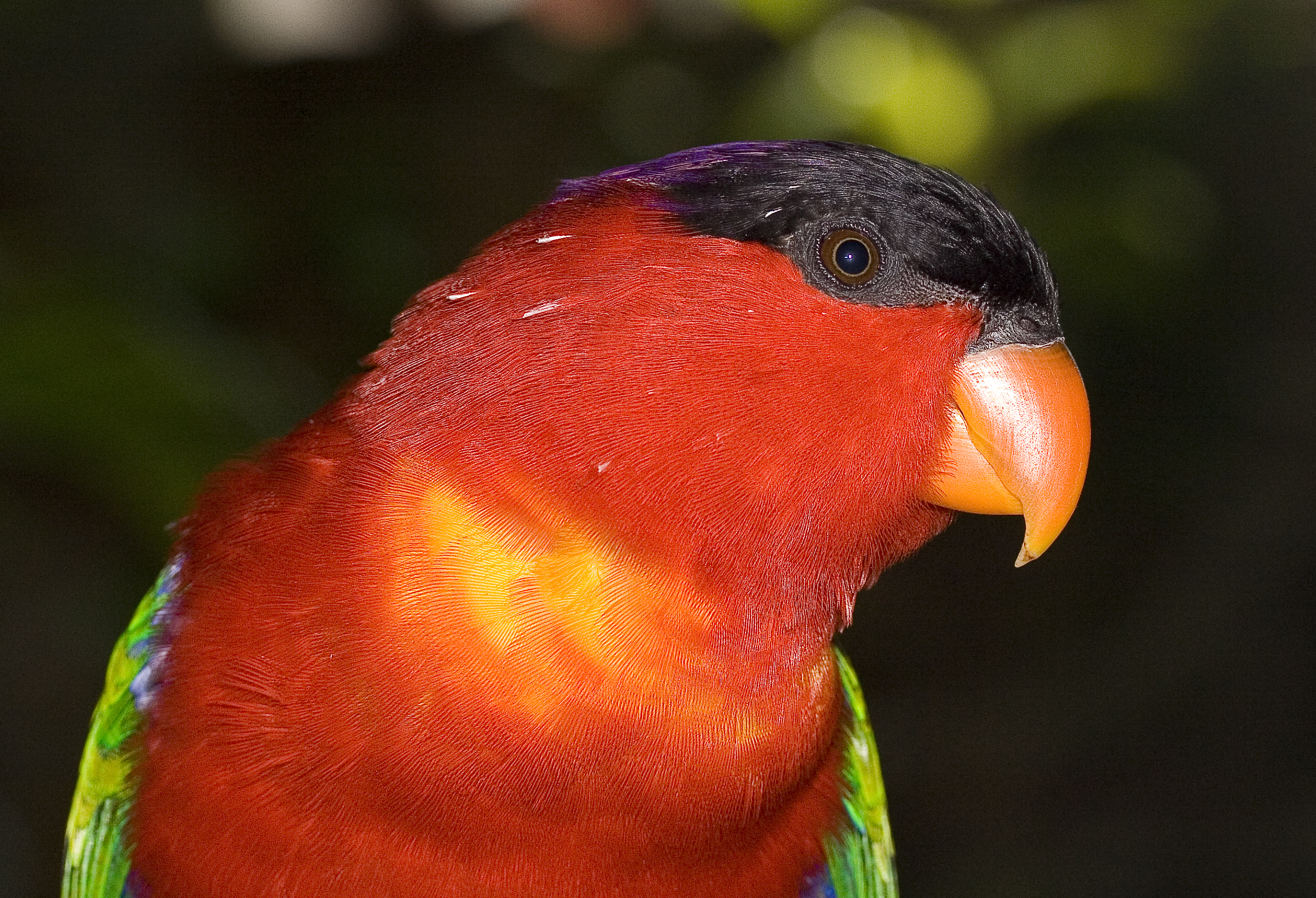
On the Banda Islands, Indonesia

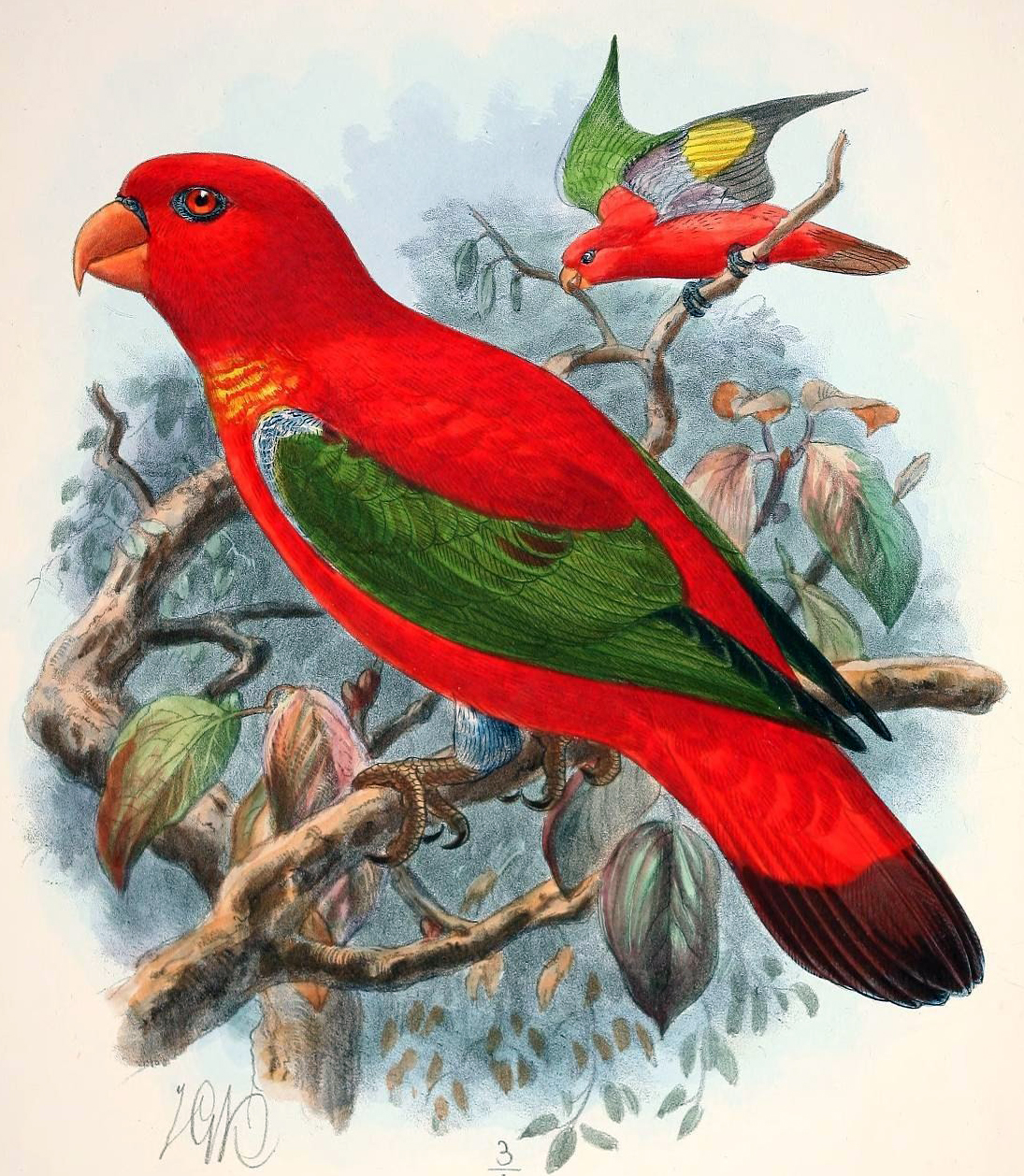
Blue-thighed lory (Lorius tibialis), which was either an extinct species or just an aberrant form of Lorius domicella

The purple-naped lory is 28 cm (11 in) long. It is mostly red with an all red tail that fades to darker red towards the tip. The top of its head is black, which fades to purple on the back of its neck. It has green wings, blue thighs, and a variable approximately transverse yellow band across the chest. It has an orange beak, dark-grey eyerings, and orange-red irises. Juveniles have a brown beak, grey-white eyerings, brown irises, a wider yellow band across the chest, and a more extensive purple patch on the back of neck.
