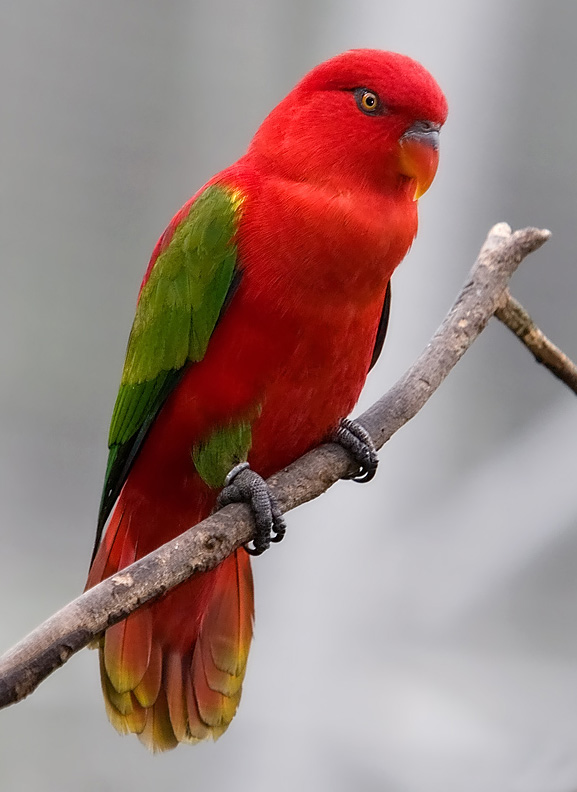
- At the Jurong Bird Park in Singapore

Conservation status
- Vulnerable (IUCN 3.1)

Scientific classification
- Kingdom: Animalia
- Phylum: Chordata
- Class: Aves
- Order: Psittaciformes
- Family: Psittaculidae
- Genus: Lorius
- Species: L. garrulus

Binomial name
- Lorius garrulus (Linnaeus, 1758)

Synonyms
- Psittacus garrulus Linnaeus, 1758

= Chattering lory =

Species of bird

The chattering lory (Lorius garrulus) is a forest-dwelling parrot endemic to North Maluku, Indonesia. It is considered vulnerable, the main threat being from trapping for the cage-bird trade.

The race L. g. flavopalliatus is known as the yellow-backed lory.

== Taxonomy ==
The chattering lory was formally described by the Swedish naturalist Carl Linnaeus in 1758 in the tenth edition of his Systema Naturae under the binomial name Psittacus garrulus. The specific epithet garrulus is Latin and means "chattering", "babbling" or "noisy". Linnaeus cited "The Scarlet Lory" that had been described and illustrated in 1751 by the English naturalist George Edwards in his book A Natural History of Uncommon Birds. The specimen had been brought to London from the East Indies and Edwards was able to make a drawing of the live bird at the home of the Whig politician Robert Walpole. Linnaeus designated the species locality as "Asia", but this is now taken to be the island of Halmahera in the Maluku Islands. The chattering lory is now placed in the genus Lorius that was introduced in 1825 by the Irish zoologist Nicholas Aylward Vigors.

Three subspecies are recognised:

- L. g. flavopalliatus Salvadori 1877 – Yellow-backed lory, found on Kasiruta, Bacan, Obi and Mandiole Islands
- L. g. garrulus (Linnaeus, 1758) – nominate, found on Halmahera, Widi and Ternate Islands
- L. g. morotaianus (van Bemmel, 1940) – found on Morotai and Rau Islands

== Description ==
The chattering lory is 30 cm (12 in) long. It is mostly red with an all-red head and an orange beak. The eyerings are grey and the irises are orange-red. The wings are mainly green and the angle of the wing is yellow. Its thighs are green. The tail is tipped with dark green. It has dark grey legs. It may or may not have a yellow area on its back depending on the subspecies.

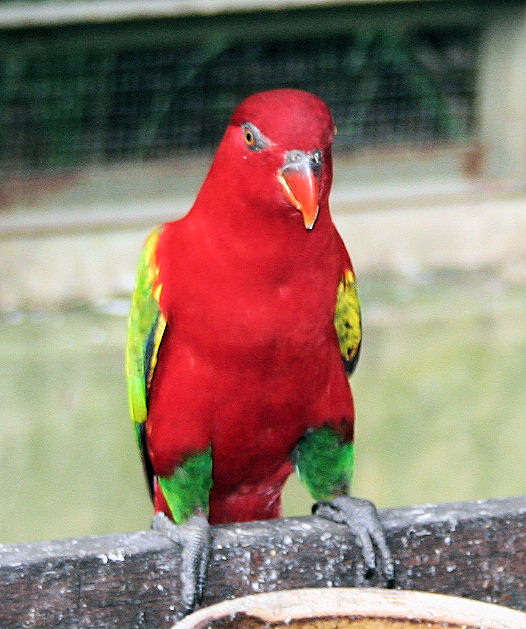
At Kuala Lumpur Bird Park

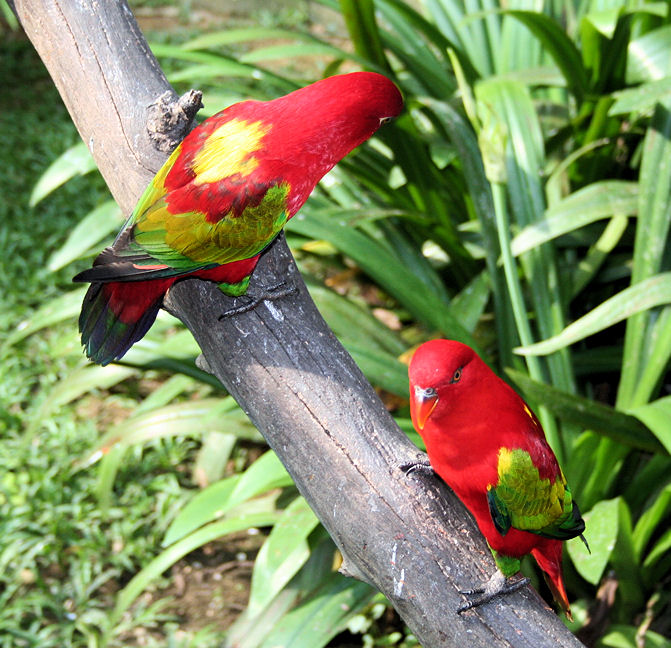
Yellow-backed lorikeets

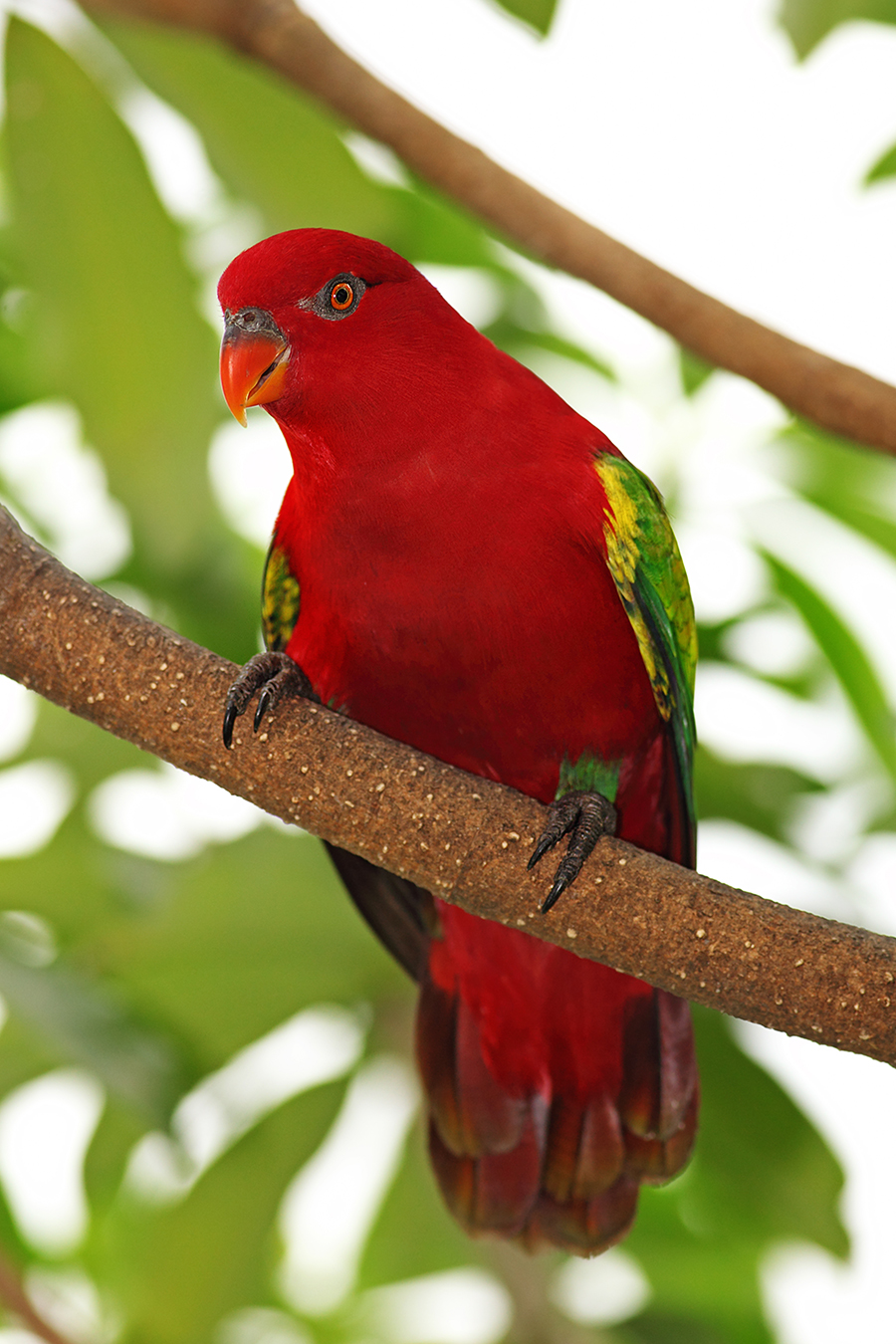
At Jurong Bird Park, Singapore

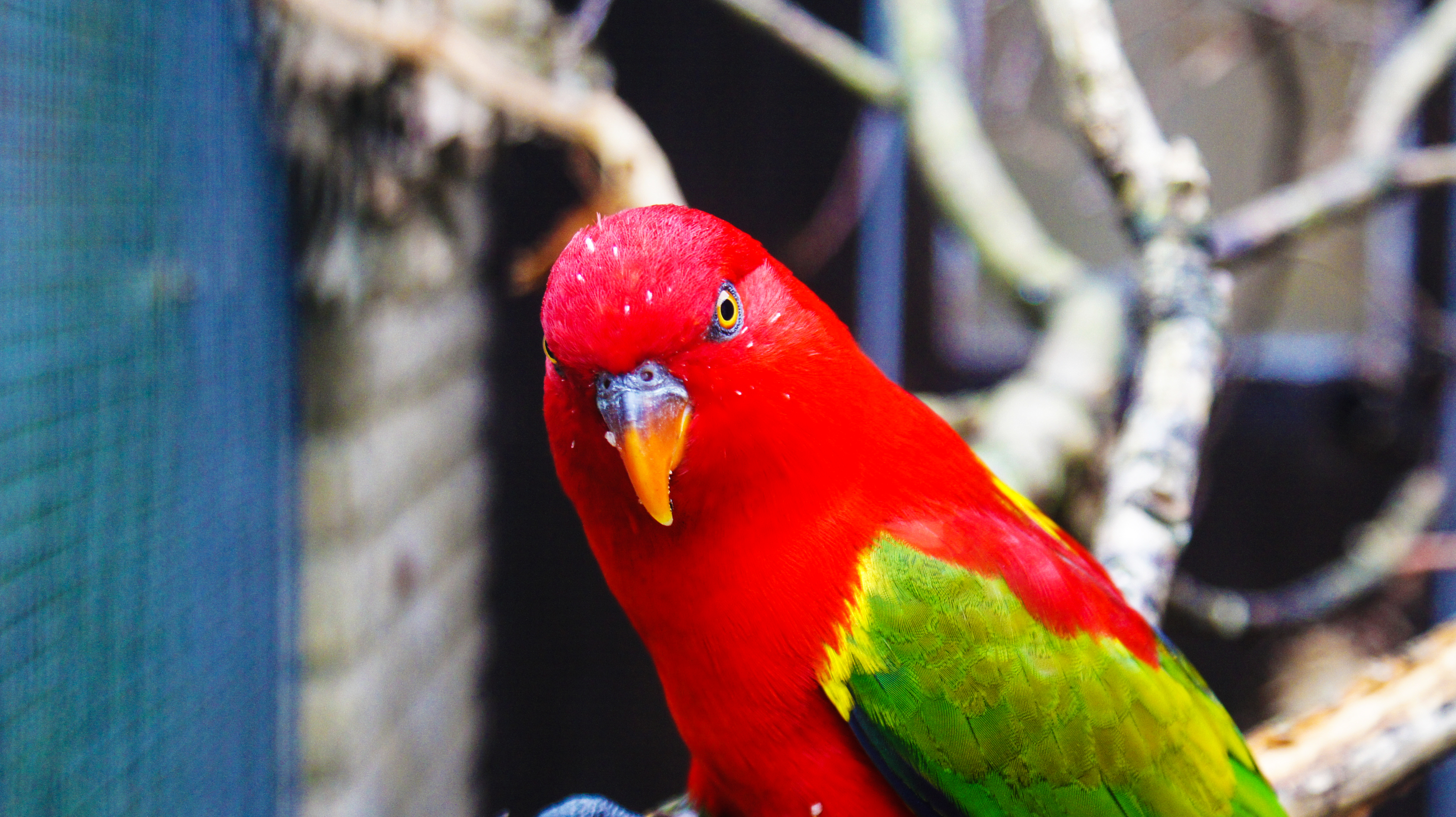
At Birdworld, England

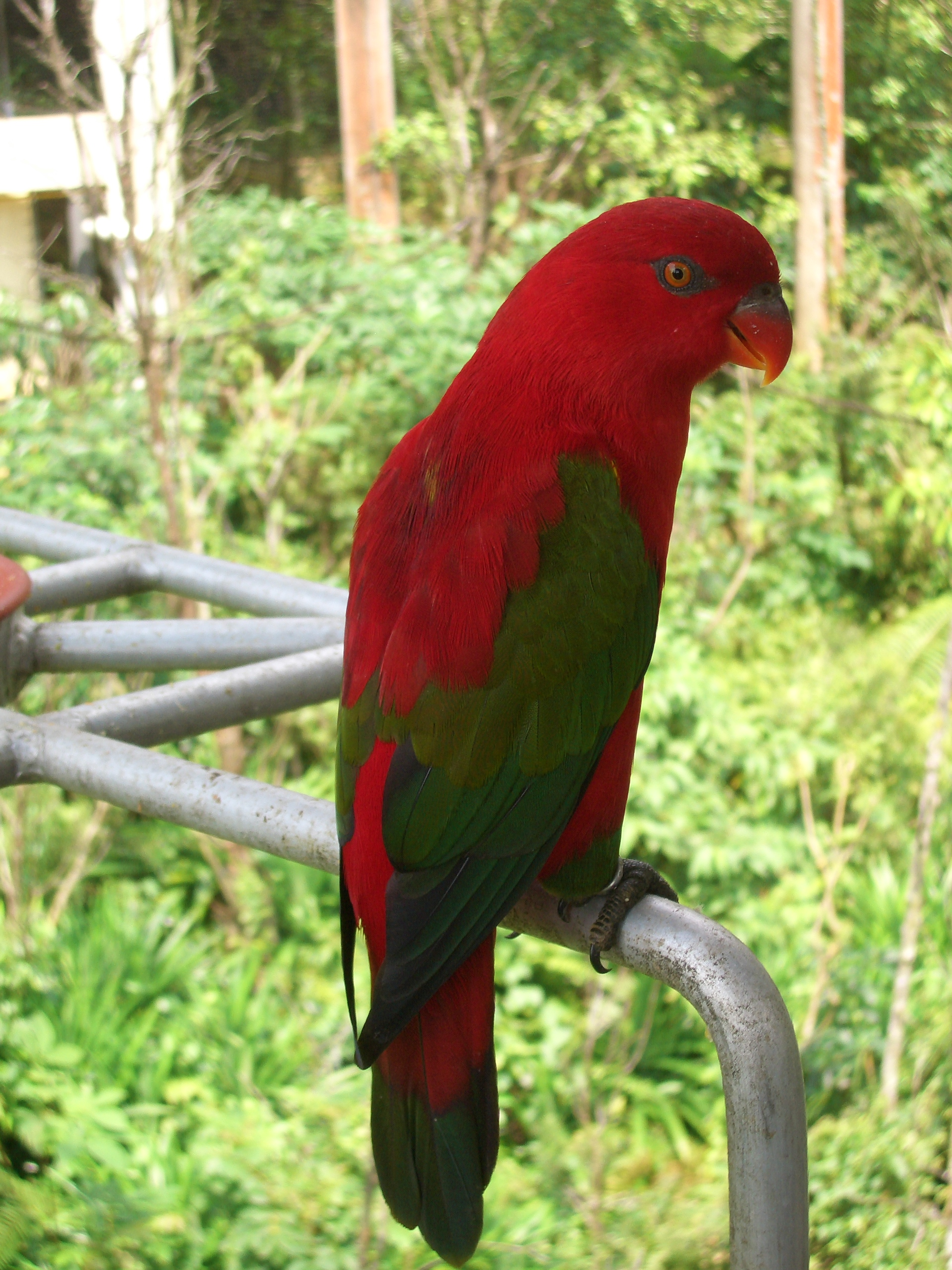

== Popular culture ==
- Since 2019, YouTube has featured a chattering yellow-backed lory named "Velvet" from his home in India.
- In May 2021, a chattering lory belonging to former Capcom sound designer Hideaki Utsumi named "Gumi" became an Internet meme, with Utsumi's YouTube channel gaining over 200,000 subscribers by August, with the lory being recognized for the "wuewuewuewue" sound that it made resembling laughter.
