= A Field Guide to the Birds of Australia (Pizzey) =

1980 book by Graham Pizzey

- Author: Graham Pizzey
- Illustrator: Roy Doyle and with extra plates by Frank Knight in the 1997 and later editions
- Cover artist: Roy Doyle
- Language: English
- Subject: Australian birds
- Genre: Field guide
- Publisher: Collins: Sydney
- Publication date: 1980
- Publication place: Australia
- Media type: Print (hardback)
- Pages: iv + 460
- ISBN: 0-00-219201-2
- Dewey Decimal: 598.2994

A Field Guide to the Birds of Australia was first published in 1980 by Collins, Sydney. It was authored by Graham Pizzey with illustrations by Roy B. Doyle. The first edition was issued in octavo format, 220 mm in height by 140 mm width, with a foreword by D.L. Serventy. It contained 460 pages of text with 32 black-and-white and 56 colour plates illustrating nearly all species of birds recorded in Australia at the time of publication. The plates were bunched between pages 300 and 301, while there were 725 maps of breeding distribution on pages 411-442 between the main text and the indexes, as well as maps of Australia in the end papers. Its success was such that it was followed by several further editions.

== History ==
In the preface to the seventh edition, Sue, Caroline, Sarah and Tom Pizzey explain some of the background to the work:

"The Field Guide to the Birds of Australia was first published in 1980, after more than fifteen years in the making. While it has continued to evolve through numerous reprints and revised editions, taking in new information, taxonomic changes, and changes in the way information has been presented, the voice throughout has remained resolutely that of its author, Graham Pizzey.

"Following the death of Graham, our husband and father, in late 2001 it soon became clear that we were all keen to see the Guide continue. After all, the entire family was there at its inception and development: travelling to various corners of the continent as Graham took countless photographs and recorded observations in the field. An article in the Herald in July 1967 shows the three Pizzey children sprawled on the living-room floor, poring over a map as we traced the journey we were about to make up through the Centre and down the west coast. The 'Big Trip' was to form the basis of the research for the first edition of the Guide, and was to give us an indelible appreciation of the natural world. And we've been involved in various ways ever since: looking at proofs, being asked for an opinion on an illustration or cover, or listening to an attempt to capture the call of a bird on paper. Responsible for providing his own children with an extraordinary childhood, this Guide is now being enjoyed by Graham's small grandchildren. Its continuing relevance underpins our desire to see it remains in print, updated and augmented regularly."

== Later editions ==
- 1991 – The second, updated, edition was published by CollinsAngus&RobertsonPublishers Pty Ltd.
- 1997 – The first major revision of the guide came with the publication of the third edition in 1997, and a change of title to The Graham Pizzey & Frank Knight Field Guide to the Birds of Australia. Published by Angus & Robertson (an imprint of HarperCollins), it had all new plates by Frank Knight, each facing the completely revised text for the birds illustrated, while the length had expanded to 576 pages. It was 235 mm in height by 155 mm in width, issued in a flexible plastic cover, and contained a foreword by Norman Wettenhall. This and following editions were dedicated by the author to "...Rolf Baldwin and John Ponder, schoolmasters, who first taught me to appreciate birds, and words".
- 2000 – fourth updated edition
- 2001 – fifth updated edition
- 2002 – sixth updated edition
- 2003 – The seventh revised and updated edition was published by HarperCollinsPublishers Pty Ltd. Following Pizzey's death the text was edited by Peter Menkhorst and the title modified slightly to Graham Pizzey & Frank Knight: The Field Guide to the Birds of Australia.
- 2007 – The eighth updated and revised edition (ISBN 0207199353) included 46 newly recorded or recently described species.
- 2012 – The ninth updated edition (ISBN 9780732291938).
