= Hideaki Utsumi =

Japanese video game composer

- 内海 秀明
- Born: Uji, Kyoto, Japan
- Other name: Tono2097
- Occupations: Video game sound designer; music teacher; composer; musician; YouTuber; audio engineer
- Known for: Resident Evil, Devil May Cry
- Spouse: Saori Utsumi

YouTube information
- Channel: Hideaki Utsumi
- Genres: Animals; Music; Miniature collecting; Video game streaming
- Subscribers: 413,000
- Views: 159,511,484
- Last updated: 20 January 2026
- Musical career
- Origin: Japan
- Genres: Pop music; Electronic music
- Years active: 1999–present
- Label: marth TERIT Records
- Members: Hideaki Utsumi; Tanaka Hit
- Website: happyducky.com/mtrc

Hideaki Utsumi (内海 秀明, Utsumi Hideaki), also known as Tono2097, is a Japanese video game sound designer, audio engineer, composer, YouTuber, and musician, and is currently an instructor at HAL Osaka, a vocational school in Osaka, Japan.

He is best known for sound design for the Resident Evil video game series, and his YouTube channel. Utsumi is also one half of the musical duo mT with Tanaka Hit, playing both the keyboard and the band's own creation, the MIDI stick, created from arcade-game controllers.

Utsumi worked in Capcom's sound design department for 14 years. He left in 2009 to teach at HAL Osaka College of Technology & Design.

He is married to former Capcom colleague Saori Maeda, who co-composed the soundtrack of Resident Evil 3: Nemesis with Masami Ueda.

== Parrots ==
In 2021, a video recorded and uploaded to Instagram of Gumi, a pet chattering lory owned by Utsumi, became popular on the Internet, forming the basis of an Internet meme. Within weeks of the video being published, Utsumi's YouTube channel would surpass 200,000 subscribers and accrue over 10 million channel views.

In addition to Gumi, Utsumi owns three other parrots: Lemon, a black-legged parrot; Kiwi, a harlequin macaw; and Kohaku, a white cockatoo. Utsumi also had a black lory named Kuromi, who died of unknown causes on September 15, 2021.

== List of works ==
Year	Title	Ref(s)
1996	Resident Evil	
1998	Resident Evil 2	
2000	El Dorado Gate	
2001	Devil May Cry	
2002	Clock Tower 3	
2002	Resident Evil (GameCube remake)	
2004	Mega Man X: Command Mission	
2005	Haunting Ground	
2006	Resident Evil: Deadly Silence	
2006	Mega Man Powered Up	
2009	Resident Evil 5	

== Discography ==
- V.A. / KIVANDELYAN (1996)
- V.A. / - natsu - (1997)
- mT / Daydream (1999)
- GAME OVER
- u-man's diary -awaji-
- Kohaku Summoning Cthulhu (2025)
- Lemon Chan Cha Cha Cha (2025)
