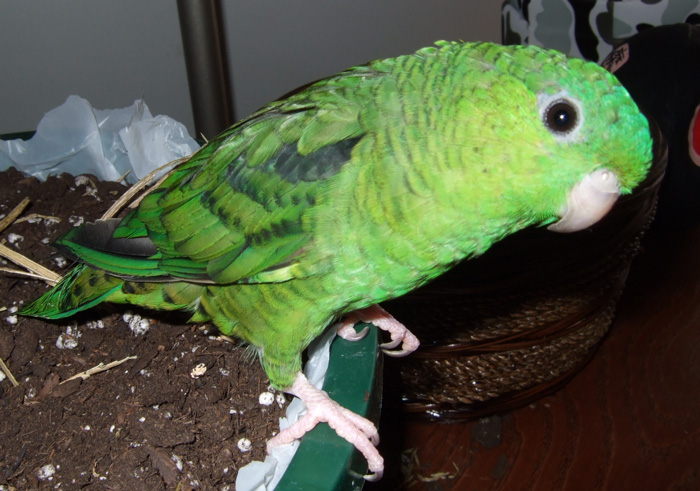
- Bolborhynchus lineola

Scientific classification
- Kingdom: Animalia
- Phylum: Chordata
- Class: Aves
- Order: Psittaciformes
- Family: Psittacidae
- Subfamily: Arinae
- Genus: Bolborhynchus; Bonaparte, 1857

Type species
- Myiopsitta catharina Bonaparte, 1857

Species
- see text

= Bolborhynchus =

Genus of birds

Bolborhynchus is a genus of parrot in the family Psittacidae.

It contains the following species:

Image	Scientific name	Common name	Distribution
	Bolborhynchus orbygnesius	Andean parakeet	central eastern Andes in Bolivia and Peru
	Bolborhynchus lineola	Barred parakeet	southern Mexico to Panama, in the Andes from western Venezuela to southern Peru and Bolivia, the Santa Marta Mountains in Colombia and the Venezuelan Coastal Range
	Bolborhynchus ferrugineifrons	Rufous-fronted parakeet	Colombia
