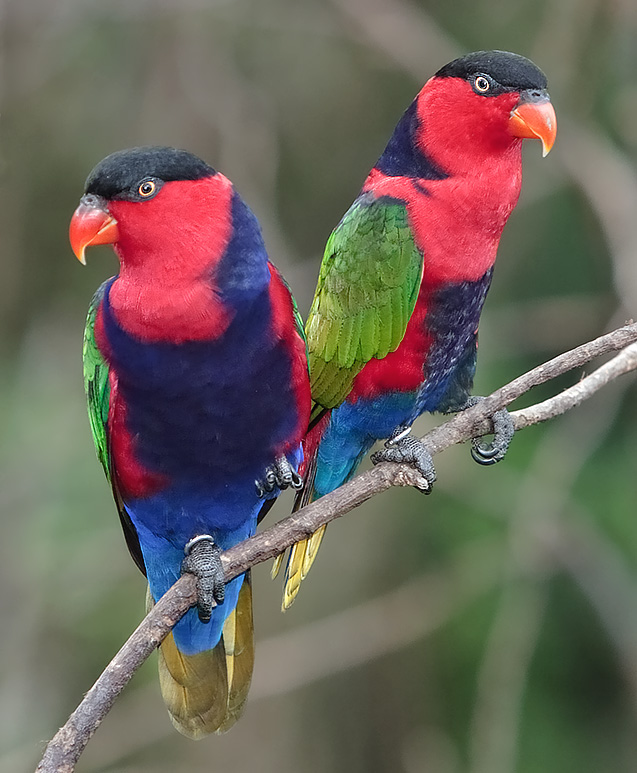
- At Jurong BirdPark, Singapore

Conservation status
- Least Concern (IUCN 3.1)

Scientific classification
- Kingdom: Animalia
- Phylum: Chordata
- Class: Aves
- Order: Psittaciformes
- Family: Psittaculidae
- Genus: Lorius
- Species: L. lory

Binomial name
- Lorius lory (Linnaeus, 1758)

Synonyms
- Psittacus lory Linnaeus, 1758

= Black-capped lory =

Species of bird

The black-capped lory (Lorius lory) also known as western black-capped lory or the tricolored lory, is a parrot found in New Guinea and adjacent smaller islands. It is a colourful and relatively robust lory (31 cm (12 in)). There are seven subspecies, all with green wings, red heads and body around the wing, a black cap, grey-black cere, yellow underwings, and blue legs and belly. Most also have a blue nape and mantle (area between wings on the back). It remains overall widespread and common, but the subspecies cyanuchen is relatively rare, with fewer than 5,000 individuals remaining.

== Taxonomy ==
The black-capped lory was formally described by the Swedish naturalist Carl Linnaeus in 1758 in the tenth edition of his Systema Naturae under the binomial name Psittacus lory. Linnaeus based his description of "The first Black Capped Lory" that had been described and illustrated in 1751 by the English naturalist George Edwards in his A Natural History of Uncommon Birds. The name lory is from the Malay word for these brightly coloured parrots. The black-capped lory is now placed in the genus Lorius that was introduced in 1825 by the Irish zoologist Nicholas Aylward Vigors.

=== Subspecies ===
Seven subspecies are recognised that vary considerably in colour:

- L. l. lory: West Papuan islands and Bird's Head Peninsula. Blue of nape, mantle, and belly merge to cover most of body and are purple-blue. Red underwing coverts. Juvenile resembles erythrothorax or cyanuchen.
- L. l. erythrothorax: The whole south coast of New Guinea east of Bird's Head Peninsula, and the SE north coast. Blue nape almost forms collar, blue comes halfway up belly. Yellow on wings. Blue mantle in two bands. Red underwing coverts.
- L. l. somu: Southern hill districts of central New Guinea. Red mantle and nape, blue only low on belly.
- L. l. salvadorii: Northwest coast of Papua New Guinea. Like erythrothorax but with blue-black underwing coverts.
- L. l. viridicrissalis: Northeast coast of Western New Guinea. Like salvadorii but blue blacker everywhere.
- L. l. jobiensis: Yapen and Mios Num islands. Like salvadorii but paler breast and mantle bands.
- L. l. cyanuchen: Biak island. Black of cap meets blue of nape, single blue mantle stripe.

== Behavior ==
The black-capped lory inhabits the primary forest and forest edges in most lowland areas up to 1,000 m (3,300 ft) (sporadically to 1,750 m (5,740 ft)), but not monsoon forest or coconut plantations. It is usually found in pairs and occasionally in groups of 10 or more. Their diet includes pollen, nectar, flowers, fruit and insects.

== Gallery ==
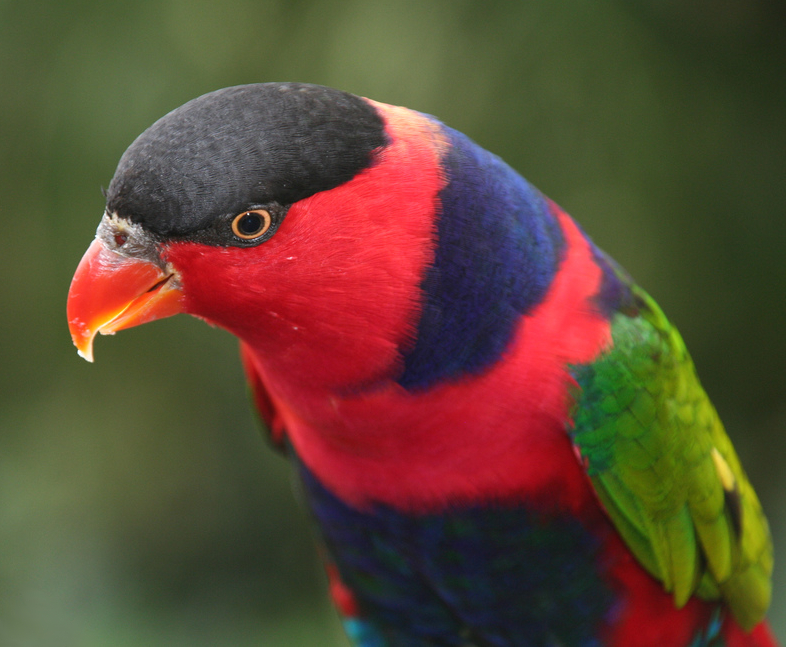
Upper body

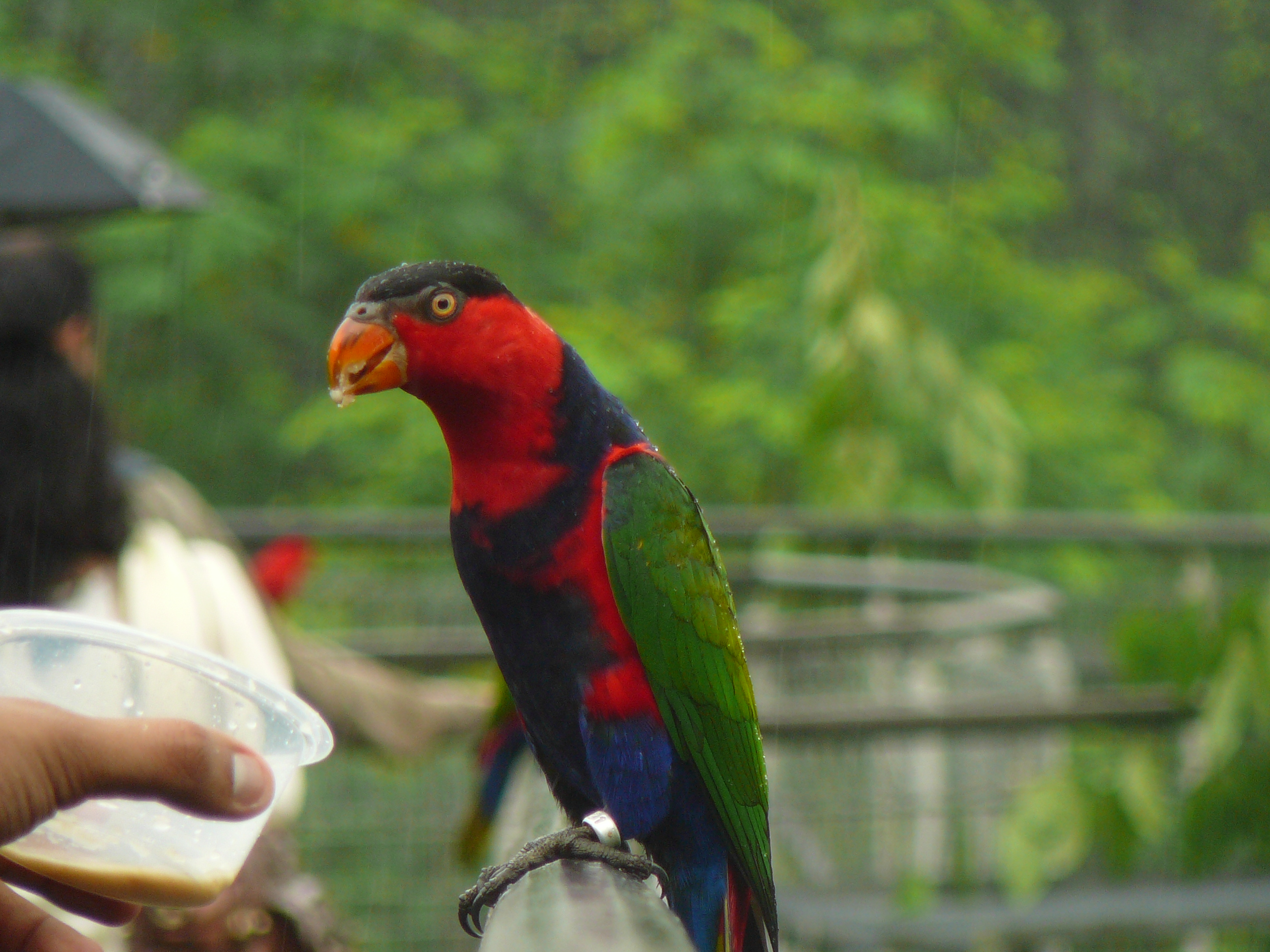
At Jurong BirdPark, Singapore

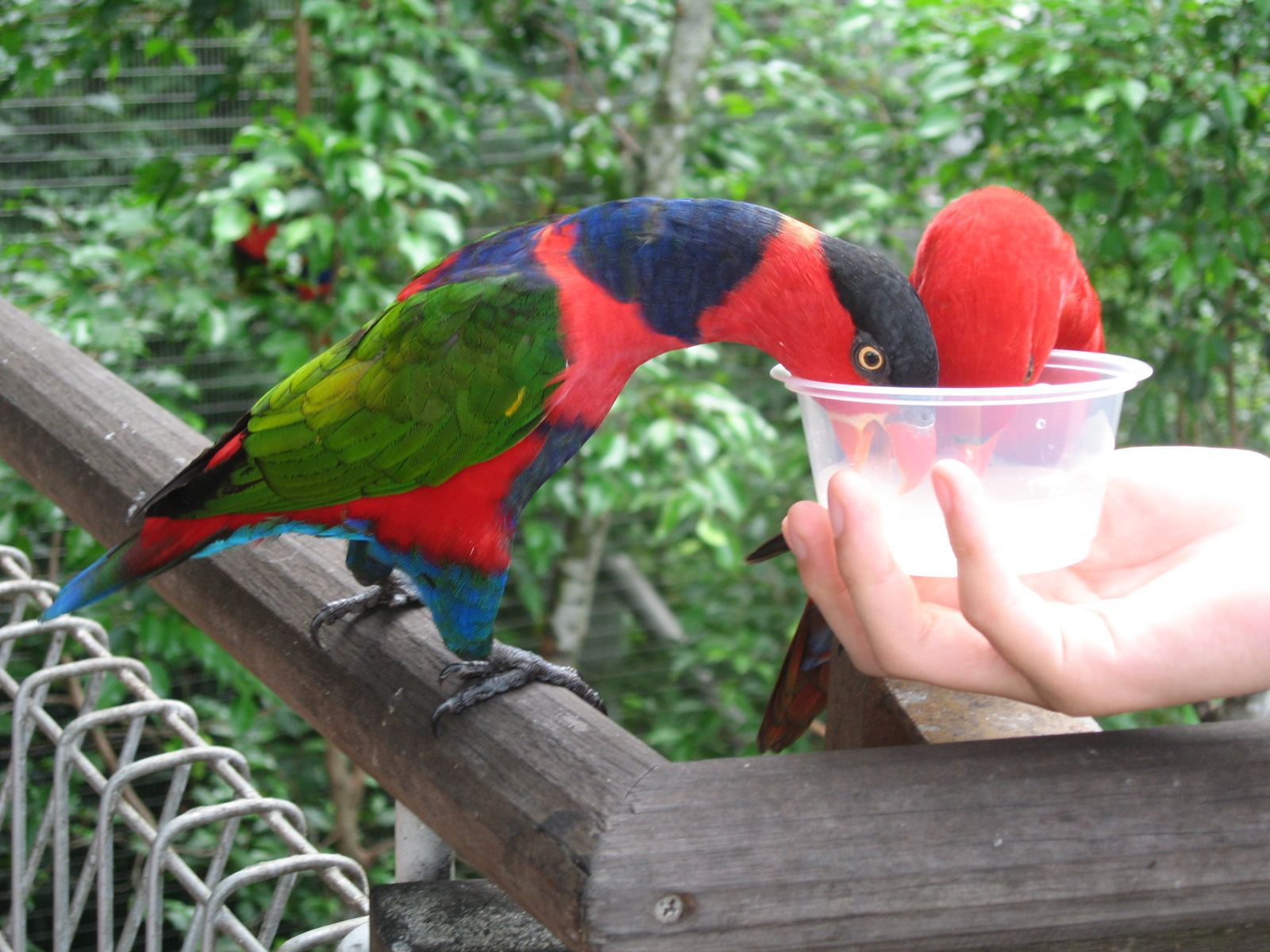
Drinking nectar at Jurong BirdPark

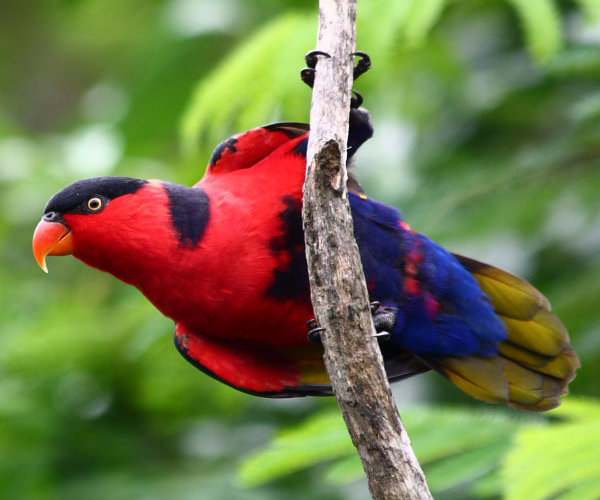
At Jurong BirdPark

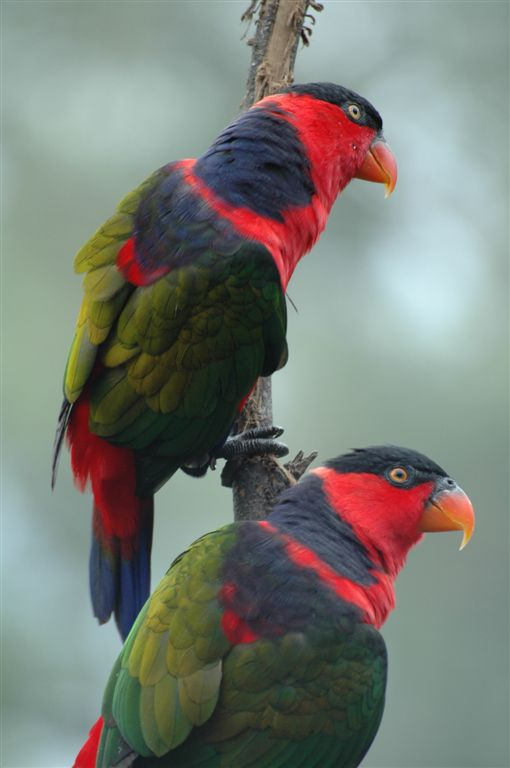
At Singapore Zoo

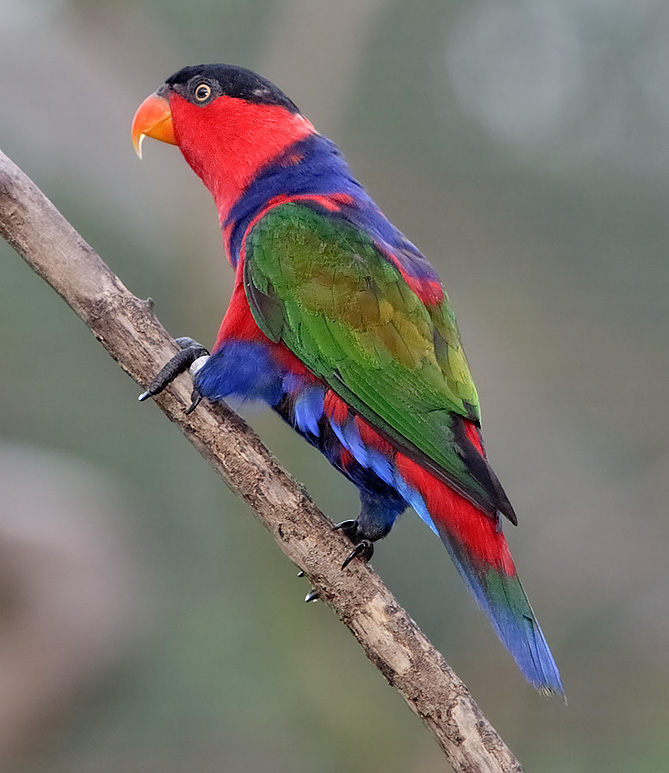
Wing plumage - at Jurong BirdPark

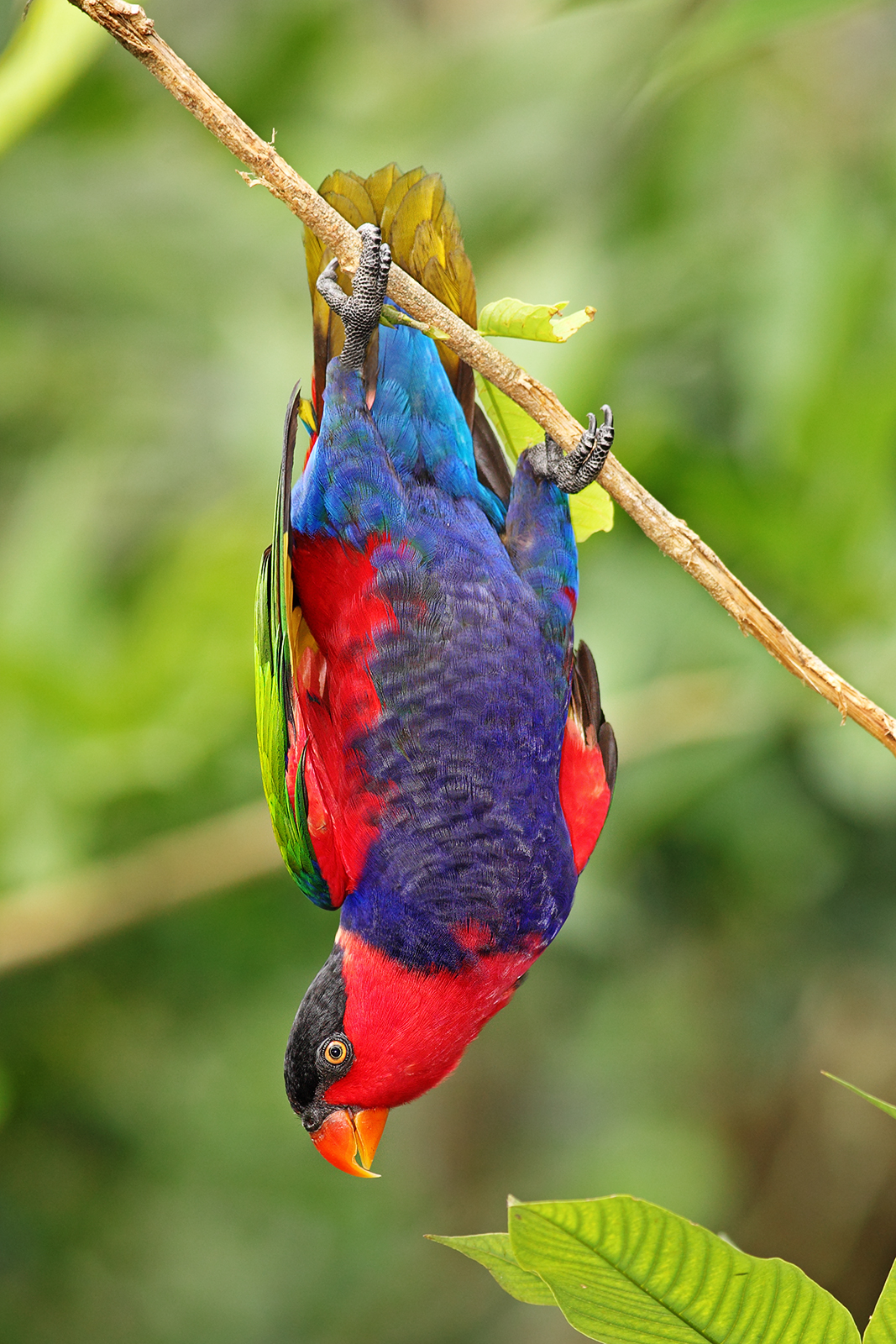
At Jurong Bird Park
