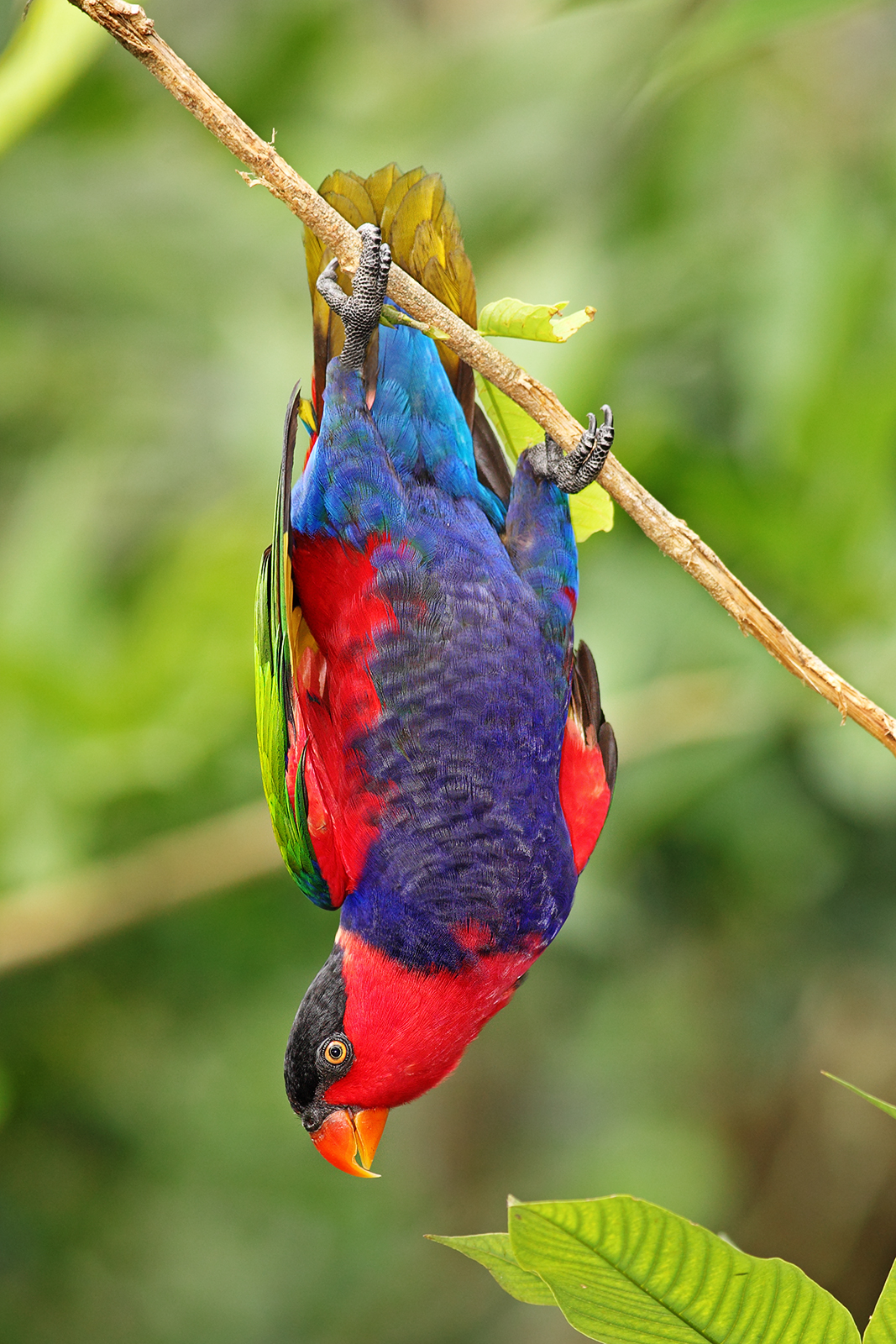
- Black-capped lory

Scientific classification
- Kingdom: Animalia
- Phylum: Chordata
- Class: Aves
- Order: Psittaciformes
- Family: Psittaculidae
- Tribe: Loriini
- Genus: Lorius; Vigors, 1825

Type species
- Psittacus domicella purple-naped lory Linnaeus, 1758

= Lorius =

Genus of birds

Lorius is a genus of lory in the parrot family Psittaculidae. The genus contains six species that are distributed from the Moluccas in Indonesia through New Guinea to the Solomon Islands. They have characteristic red plumage with varying amounts of blue (and in some yellow and white), green wings, and in all but one species a black crown. The bills are orange and the feet are grey. With lengths of up to 25 to 30 cm (9.8 to 11.8 in) and average weights of 132 to 190 g (4.7 to 6.7 oz), the members of this genus tend to be the largest of the Loriinae subfamily.

== Taxonomy ==
The genus Lorius was introduced in 1825 by the Irish zoologist Nicholas Aylward Vigors with the purple-naped lory as the type species. The word "lory" comes from the Malay lūri, a name used for a number of species of colourful parrots. The word was used by the Dutch writer Johan Nieuhof in 1682 in a book describing his travels in the East Indies. The spelling "laurey" was used by English naturalist Eleazar Albin in 1731 for a species of parrot from Brazil, and then in 1751 the English naturalist George Edwards used the spelling "lory" when introducing names for five species of parrot from the East Indies in the fourth volume of his A Natural History of Uncommon Birds. Edwards credited Nieuhof for the name.

=== Species ===
The genus contains six species.

Genus Lorius – Vigors, 1825 – six species
Common name	Scientific name and subspecies	Range	Size and ecology	IUCN status and estimated population
Chattering lory	Lorius garrulus (Linnaeus, 1758) Three subspecies: L. g. flavopalliatus Salvadori 1877; L. g. garrulus (Linnaeus, 1758); L. g. morotaianus (van Bemmel, 1940)	Three subspecies endemic to North Maluku of Indonesia	Size: Habitat: Diet:	VU
Yellow-bibbed lory	Lorius chlorocercus Gould, 1856	eastern Solomon Islands	Size: Habitat: Diet:	LC
Black-capped lory	Lorius lory Linnaeus, 1758 Seven subspecies: L. l. lory; L. l. erythrothorax; L. l. somu; L. l. salvadorii; L. l. viridicrissalis; L. l. jobiensis; L. l. cyanuchen	New Guinea and several Papuan islands	Size: Habitat: Diet:	LC
Purple-bellied lory	Lorius hypoinochrous (Gray, 1859) Three subspecies: L. h. devittatus Hartert 1898; L. h. hypoinochrous Gray, GR 1859; L. h. rosselianus Rothschild & Hartert 1918	New Guinea	Size: Habitat: Diet:	LC
White-naped lory	Lorius albidinucha (Rothschild & Hartert, 1924)	New Ireland, Papua New Guinea	Size: Habitat: Diet:	LC
Purple-naped lory	Lorius domicella (Linnaeus, 1758)	Seram and Ambon Indonesia	Size: Habitat: Diet:	EN

Turn around video of the male Lorius lory viridicrissalis De Beaufort, 1909. Museum specimen, syntype, Naturalis Biodiversity Center

Turn around video of the female Lorius lory viridicrissalis De Beaufort, 1909. Museum specimen, syntype, Naturalis Biodiversity Center
