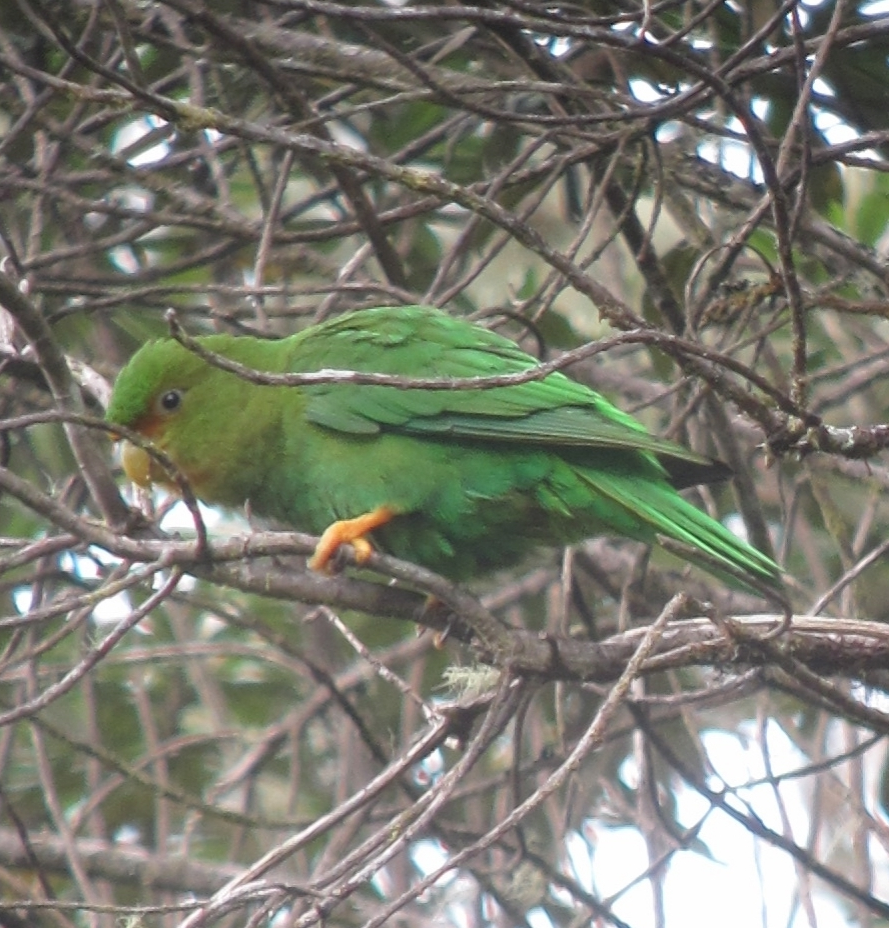

Conservation status
- Vulnerable (IUCN 3.1)

Scientific classification
- Kingdom: Animalia
- Phylum: Chordata
- Class: Aves
- Order: Psittaciformes
- Family: Psittacidae
- Genus: Bolborhynchus
- Species: B. ferrugineifrons

Binomial name
- Bolborhynchus ferrugineifrons (Lawrence, 1880)

= Rufous-fronted parakeet =

Species of bird

The rufous-fronted parakeet (Bolborhynchus ferrugineifrons) is a species of parrot in the family Psittacidae. Endemic to Colombia, its natural habitats are high-altitude shrubland, high-altitude grassland and arable land. It is threatened by habitat destruction and is classified as "vulnerable" by the International Union for Conservation of Nature.

== Description ==
This parakeet grows to a length of about 18 cm (7 in) and the sexes are similar. This is a robust, small species with dull green plumage above and bluish-green wings. The lores and a narrow band on the forehead are brownish-red, and the cheeks, throat, breast and belly are yellowish-green. The short, pointed tail is green above and bluish-green below. There is a grey ring round the eye, the iris is brown, the beak is yellowish-horn and the feet are grey.

== Distribution and habitat ==
The species is endemic to Colombia where it is found in two areas of the High Andes at altitudes between about 3,000 and 4,000 m (10,000 and 13,000 ft). The largest population is on the Volcán Ruiz-Tolima massif in the Central Cordillera but there is a smaller population on Puracé Volcano in the Cauca Department, and the bird's range may well include the intervening area. Its typical habitat is páramo, a high altitude grass and shrub ecosystem lying between the high snow-capped mountains and the montane forest below, and sub-páramo. It is also present in montane shrublands, and even agricultural land at high elevations.

== Ecology ==
The rufous-fronted parakeet is gregarious, forming small flocks of 10 to 100. It feeds mostly on the ground, eating grass seed, flowers and fruits. It roosts on cliffs and also nests there, but little is known of its reproductive habits.

== Status ==
B. ferrugineifrons used to be considered "endangered" but the International Union for Conservation of Nature has now assessed its conservation status as "vulnerable", estimating that there are between 2000 and 4000 individual birds, and that the number is probably decreasing. Its habitat is increasingly being used for harvesting timber and for farming; habitat destruction takes place as the páramo vegetation is burned to promote new growth, and increasing numbers of livestock are grazed. However, the birds are present in a number of protected areas and seem to be able to tolerate some disturbance of their habitat, sometimes foraging in upland pastureland and arable land.
