= Frank Knight (artist) =

Australian wildlife artist and ornithologist

- Born: 1941 (age 84–85); Port Hedland, Western Australia
- Known for: Science and natural history illustrations

Frank Knight (born 1941) is an Australian wildlife artist and ornithologist. He was born in Port Hedland, Western Australia. He worked as a field and laboratory assistant for the CSIRO from 1959 to 1966, and was the illustrator for the CSIRO's Division of Wildlife Research from 1966 until 1989. He was the illustrator of The Graham Pizzey and Frank Knight Field Guide to the Birds of Australia and A Field Guide to the Mammals of Australia, as well as of many other scientific and natural history texts and children's books. He has had several solo exhibitions in Australia.

== Selected works ==
- Forshaw, Joseph M. (2006). Parrots of the World; an Identification Guide. Illustrated by Frank Knight. Princeton University Press. ISBN 0-691-09251-6.
- Pizzey, Graham; Knight, Frank (1997). The Graham Pizzey & Frank Knight Field Guide to the Birds of Australia. Sydney: HarperCollins. ISBN 0-207-19821-7.
- Menkhorst, Peter (2001). A Field Guide to the Mammals of Australia. Illustrated by Frank Knight. Oxford University Press. ISBN 0-19-550870-X.
