= Joseph Forshaw (ornithologist) =

Australian ornithologist

Joseph Michael Forshaw is an Australian ornithologist, and expert on parrots. He was the former head of wildlife conservation for the Australian National Parks and Wildlife Service.

== Biography ==
Born in Newcastle, Forshaw "trained as a pharmacist", and worked as a biologist for the Commonwealth Scientific and Industrial Research Organisation (CSIRO) Division of Wildlife Research from around 1960 until 1974, when he became a senior environmental officer in the Australian National Parks and Wildlife Service.

On 26 January 2016, he was named a Member of the Order of Australia.

== Bibliography ==
- Forshaw, Joseph M. (2006). Parrots of the World; an Identification Guide. Illustrated by Frank Knight. Princeton University Press. ISBN 0-691-09251-6.
