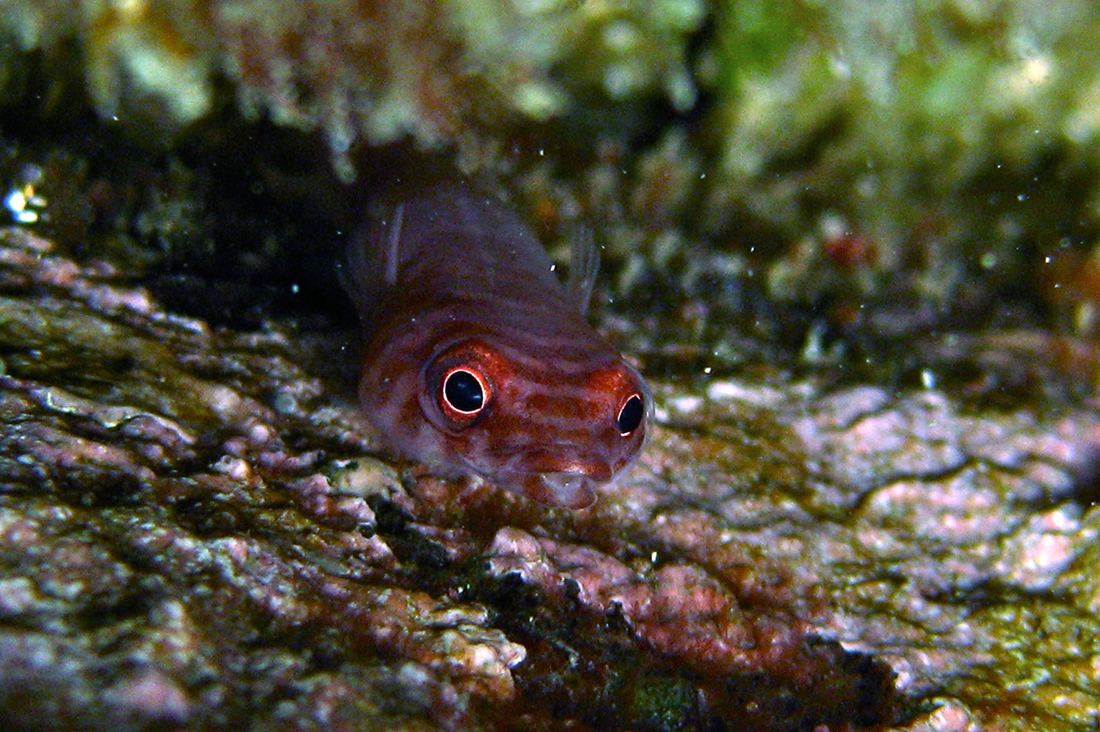

Scientific classification
- Kingdom: Animalia
- Phylum: Chordata
- Class: Actinopterygii
- Order: Blenniiformes
- Family: Gobiesocidae
- Genus: Aspasmogaster
- Species: A. costata

Binomial name
- Aspasmogaster costata (Ogilby, 1885)

Synonyms
- Diplocrepis costatus Ogilby, 1885

= Aspasmogaster costata =

Species of fish

Aspasmogaster costata, the eastern clingfish or pink clingfish is a species of clingfish from the family Gobiesocidae. It is endemic to eastern Australia where it occurs from Byron Bay to the Nadgee Nature Reserve in southern New South Wales and also on Lord Howe Island in the Tasman Sea. This is a secretive species which frequently hides under rocks, shelters in crevices or behind sea urchins at depths down to 20 metres (66 ft). The species was described in 1885 by James Douglas Ogilby with a type locality of Shark Reef near Port Jackson in New South Wales.
