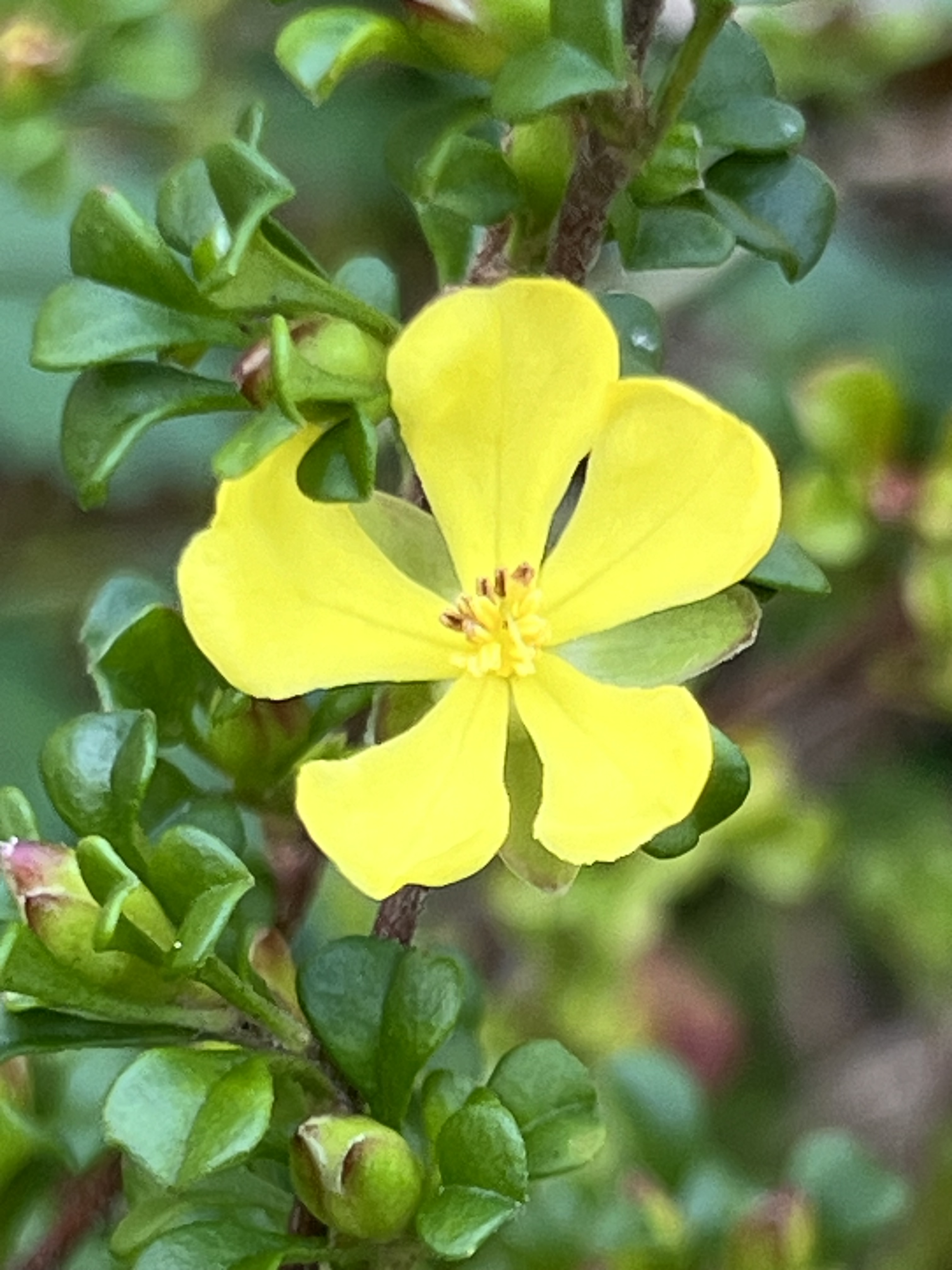

Scientific classification
- Kingdom: Plantae
- Clade: Tracheophytes
- Clade: Angiosperms
- Clade: Eudicots
- Order: Dilleniales
- Family: Dilleniaceae
- Genus: Hibbertia
- Species: H. circumdans

Binomial name
- Hibbertia circumdans Toelken

= Hibbertia circumdans =

Species of plant

Hibbertia circumdans is a species of flowering plant in the family Dilleniaceae and is endemic to New South Wales. It is an erect shrub with hairy branches, linear to wedge-shaped or spatula-shaped leaves, and yellow flowers arranged on short side shoots, with fifteen to thirty stamens arranged in groups around the three carpels.

== Description ==
Hibbertia circumdans is an erect shrub that typically grows to a height of 60 cm (24 in) with glabrous branches. The leaves are linear to wedge-shaped or spatula-shaped, 5–12 mm (0.20–0.47 in) long and 2–5 mm (0.079–0.197 in) wide, folded lengthwise and with the edges curved downwards. The flowers are on the ends of short side shoots and are sessile with bracts about 2 mm (0.079 in) long. The five sepals are egg-shaped, 5–6.5 mm (0.20–0.26 in) long and the petals are spatula-shaped, 5.5–11 mm (0.22–0.43 in) long and 6–11 mm (0.24–0.43 in) wide. There are fifteen to thirty stamens arranged around three glabrous carpels. Flowering mostly occurs from August to November.

== Taxonomy ==
Hibbertia circumdans was first formally described in 1990 by Barry Conn in the journal Muelleria from specimens collected by Ruurd Dirk Hoogland near Capertee in 1972. The specific epithet (circumdans) refers to the arrangement of the stamens around the carpels.

== Distribution and habitat ==
This hibbertia grows in the shrub layer of woodland and forest between the Pilliga Scrub and Nadgee Nature Reserve in New South Wales.

== See also ==
- List of Hibbertia species
