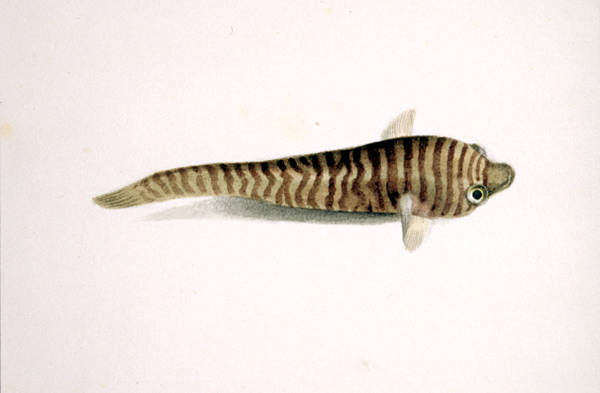

Scientific classification
- Kingdom: Animalia
- Phylum: Chordata
- Class: Actinopterygii
- Order: Blenniiformes
- Family: Gobiesocidae
- Genus: Aspasmogaster
- Species: A. tasmaniensis

Binomial name
- Aspasmogaster tasmaniensis (Günther, 1861)

Synonyms
- Crepidogaster tasmaniensis Günther, 1861; Volgiolus interorbitalis Whitley, 1943; Aspasmogaster patella Scott, 1954

= Tasmanian clingfish =

Species of fish

The Tasmanian clingfish (Aspasmogaster tasmaniensis) is a clingfish of the family Gobiesocidae, found around the western and southern coasts of Australia including Tasmania. Its length is up to 8 cm. This species is found in shallow, coastal, rocky reefs and in the intertidal zone. It is also encountered by scuba divers beneath piers and jetties.
