= Nadgee to Mallacoota Inlet Important Bird Area =

Important Bird Area in New South Wales, Australia

Coordinates: 37°26′13″S 149°52′22″E

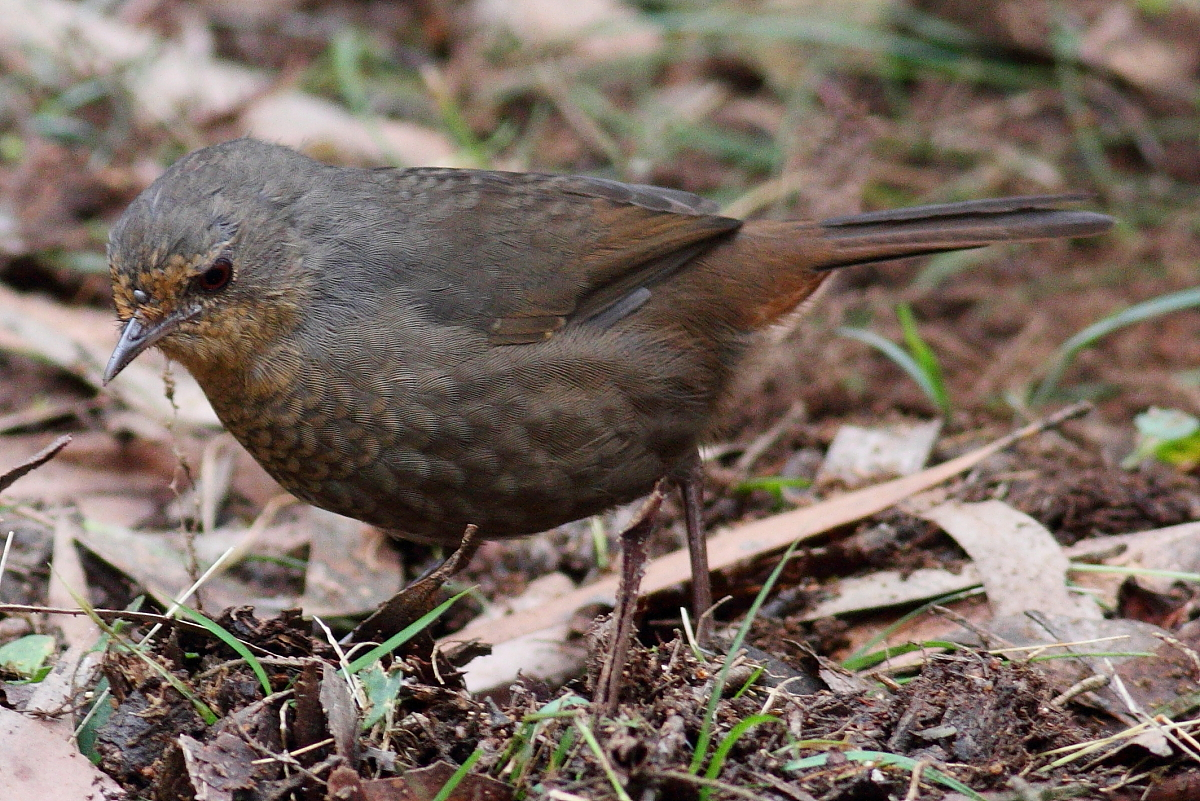
The IBA is an important site for pilotbirds

The Nadgee to Mallacoota Inlet Important Bird Area comprises some 385 square kilometres (149 sq mi) of coastal and subcoastal land at the south-eastern corner of the Australian continent, where Cape Howe marks the junction between the Tasman Sea and Bass Strait, as well as the eastern end of the state border between New South Wales and Victoria. It includes the whole of the 207 square kilometres (80 sq mi) Nadgee Nature Reserve in New South Wales with the adjoining 167 square kilometres (64 sq mi) eastern section of the Croajingolong National Park in East Gippsland, Victoria. The western border of the site is formed by Mallacoota Inlet.

== Description ==
The habitat contained in the IBA is mainly a mosaic of coastal heath and eucalypt woodland, including patches of temperate rainforest, wet heath, sedge swamp, dune swales and dry shrubland. Its temperate coastal vegetation constitutes one of the least disturbed such areas on the mainland of Australia, giving it a nationally significant level of structural and floristic integrity. Among the plants are six rare and several restricted species, with 24 species at their southern distributional limit.

== Fauna ==
=== Birds ===
The site has been identified by BirdLife International as an Important Bird Area (IBA) because it supports the isolated southernmost population of the endangered eastern bristlebird, with an estimated size of 300 individuals, as well as a population of pilotbirds. Other birds for which the IBA is important include ground parrots, pied and sooty oystercatchers, powerful, sooty and masked owls, pink robins, striated fieldwrens and hooded plovers.

=== Mammals ===
Mammals found in the area include long-nosed potoroos, southern brown bandicoots, yellow-bellied gliders, tiger quolls and dingos.
