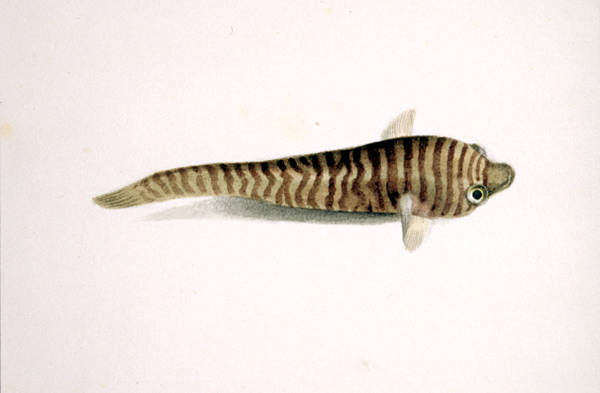
- Tasmanian Clingfish (A. tasmaniensis)

Scientific classification
- Kingdom: Animalia
- Phylum: Chordata
- Class: Actinopterygii
- Division: Teleostei
- Order: Blenniiformes
- Family: Gobiesocidae
- Subfamily: Gobiesocinae
- Genus: Aspasmogaster; Waite, 1907

Type species
- Crepidogaster tasmaniensis Günther, 1861

= Aspasmogaster =

Genus of fishes

Aspasmogaster is a genus of clingfishes native to the Indian and Pacific Oceans.

== Species ==
There are currently four recognized species in this genus:

- Aspasmogaster costata (J. D. Ogilby, 1885) (Eastern clingfish)
- Aspasmogaster liorhyncha Briggs, 1955 (Smooth-snout clingfish)
- Aspasmogaster occidentalis Hutchins, 1984
- Aspasmogaster tasmaniensis (Günther, 1861) (Tasmanian clingfish)
