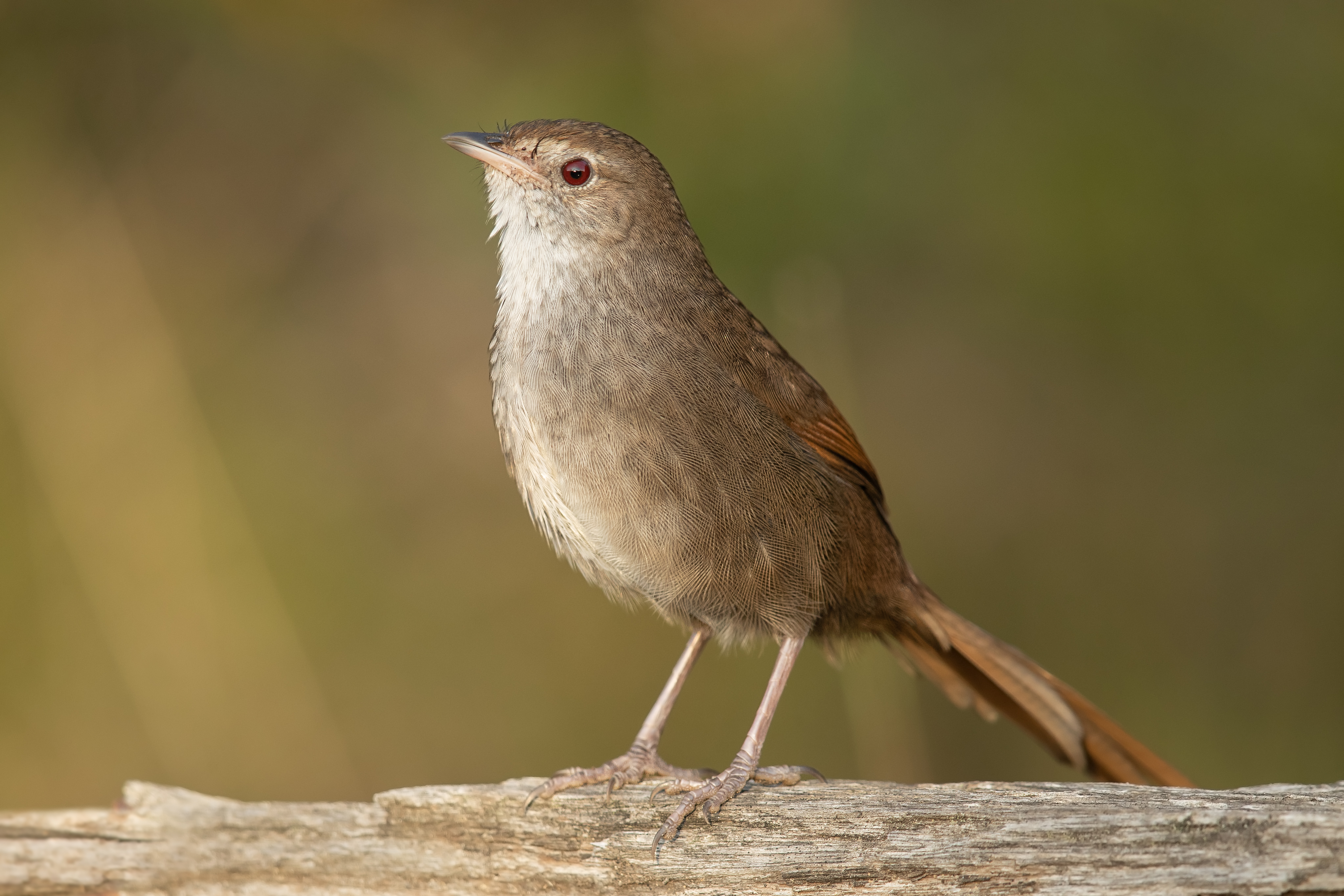

Conservation status
- Vulnerable (IUCN 3.1)

Scientific classification
- Kingdom: Animalia
- Phylum: Chordata
- Class: Aves
- Order: Passeriformes
- Family: Dasyornithidae
- Genus: Dasyornis
- Species: D. brachypterus

Binomial name
- Dasyornis brachypterus (Latham, 1801)
- Species distribution

= Eastern bristlebird =

Species of bird

The eastern bristlebird (Dasyornis brachypterus) is a species of bird in the bristlebird family, Dasyornithidae. It is endemic to Australia. Its natural habitats are temperate forests, temperate shrubland, and temperate grassland. It is threatened by habitat loss.

== Distribution and habitat ==
The eastern bristlebird is very territorial and will often use a distinct, loud melodic song to mark its territory.

Surveys have found the bird prefers to live in small, localised populations, and prefer to build their nests on the ground in areas of dense, clumped grasses.

=== Populations ===
An isolated colony was found in the Conondale Range in southeastern Queensland in the 1980s.

In late 2021, it was estimated that there were only about 2,500 of the species left in the wild, existing in isolated populations in eastern New South Wales and southern Queensland. There are four separate populations: one in northern NSW and into southern Queensland, including the Border Ranges National Park (around 40 birds); one in the Southern Highlands; one in the Jervis Bay area; and one southern population around the NSW border with Victoria, which includes Nadgee Nature Reserve and Croajingolong National Park.

=== Important Bird Areas ===
Sites identified by BirdLife International as being important for eastern bristlebird conservation are the Scenic Rim on the border between southern Queensland and northern New South Wales, Budderoo and Barren Grounds, Jervis Bay, and Nadgee to Mallacoota Inlet straddling the border between south-eastern New South Wales and eastern Victoria.

== Conservation ==
=== Status ===
Eastern bristlebirds are listed as endangered on the Australian Environment Protection and Biodiversity Conservation Act 1999.

- In New South Wales, it is listed as endangered under the Threatened Species Conservation Act 1995.
- In Queensland, it is listed as endangered under the Nature Conservation Act 1992 .
- In Victoria, it is listed as endangered on the 2007 advisory list of threatened vertebrate fauna. It is listed as threatened under the Victorian Flora and Fauna Guarantee Act (1988), under which an Action Statement for the recovery and management of the species has been prepared.

=== Conservation efforts ===
Because of the small, isolated nature of the populations of eastern bristlebird, it suffers from a lack of genetic diversity, which can lead to extinction. In an effort to counteract this, a technique known as "genetic rescue" is being used in New South Wales as of 2021, under the Saving our Species program. The program involves selecting individuals that have been breeding successfully from the larger populations of birds, and putting them into the smaller ones.

Along with the genetic rescue program, a captive breeding program is under way at the Currumbin Wildlife Sanctuary in Queensland. By breeding the birds selectively, the conservationists aim to improve resistance to disease, increase genetic diversity and raise the fertility rate, especially in the smallest population in northern NSW.

Several organisations are involved in the program besides Currimbin: Cesar Australia, (Note: Appears to be misspelt in the ABC article.) the Victorian Department of Environment, Land, Water and Planning (DELWP), the University of Queensland, Parks Australia and the Australian Department of Defence.

== See also ==
- List of Nature Conservation Act endangered fauna of Queensland
