= Nadgee Nature Reserve =

Nature reserve in New South Wales, Australia

- IUCN category Ib (wilderness area)
- Location within New South Wales
- Location: New South Wales
- Nearest city: Eden
- Coordinates: 37°18′S 149°56′E
- Area: 206.71 km^{2} (79.81 sq mi)
- Established: December 1957
- Governing body: NSW National Parks and Wildlife Service
- Website: Official website

The Nadgee Nature Reserve is a protected nature reserve in the far south coast region of New South Wales, in eastern Australia. The 20,671-hectare (51,080-acre) reserve is situated to the immediate south of Beowa National Park. Its southern border is bounded by the Black-Allan Line that marks the straight–line border between New South Wales and Victoria, where it abuts Croajingolong National Park.

Some 18,800 hectares (46,000 acres) of the reserve is declared a wilderness area; and additional parts of the reserve accommodate a diverse range of activities including bushwalking, cycling, swimming, fishing and sea kayaking.

== History ==
The area was inhabited by the Bidawal indigenous people, and many shell middens have been found along the coastline. Art and burial sites are located at Wonboyn Beach within the reserve. The first Europeans to visit the area were survivors of Sydney Cove, who encountered members of the Bidawal tribe on 29 March 1797 while en route to Sydney. Since then, the region was impacted little by European settlement, with only two farms and surrounding acreage cultivated. In 1954, Allen Strom, Allan Fox and Charles Witheford proposed the gazetting of a reserve, to which the New South Wales Government responded by naming it the Nadgee Faunal Reserve in 1957. The reserve was enlarged with the addition of the (recently logged) upper catchment of the Nadgee River in the 1970s.

== Flora and fauna ==
Vegetation types within the park include dry eucalyptus forest, heathland and saltwater wetlands. Much of the vegetation was burnt in bushfires in 1972 (from a lightning strike) and 1980 (from a logging burn-off). A variety of mammal species inhabit the reserve including swamp wallaby, eastern grey kangaroo, common wombat, agile and dusky antechinus and sugar glider.

=== Birds ===
The varied habitats support a wide variety of bird species, 34 of which occur in the heathland areas alone. Species of note include the sooty owl, eastern ground parrot, little tern and endangered eastern bristlebird. The reserve lies within the Nadgee to Mallacoota Inlet Important Bird Area, so identified by BirdLife International because it supports populations of eastern bristlebirds and pilotbirds as well as other significant fauna.
