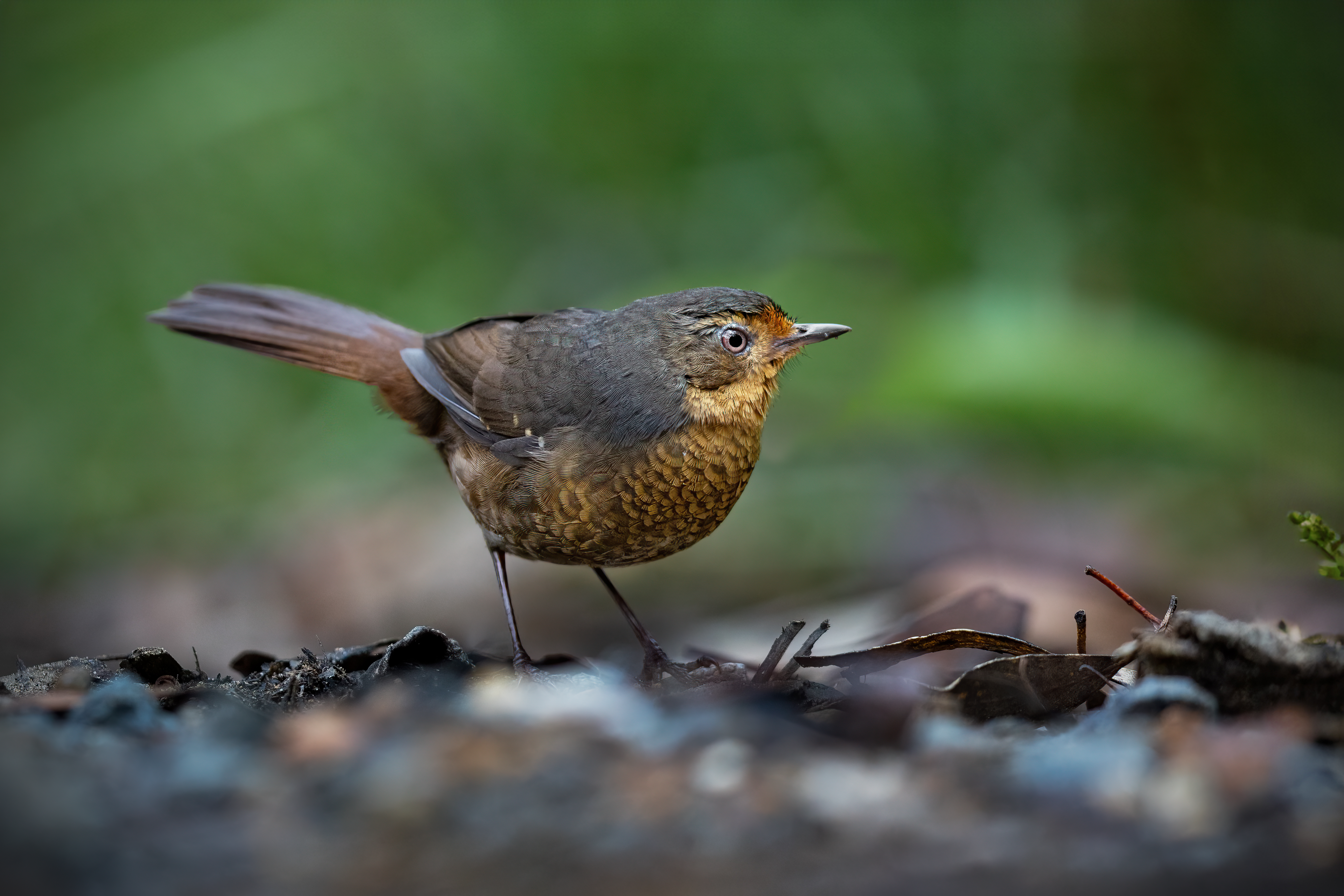
- Pilotbird, Blue Mountains
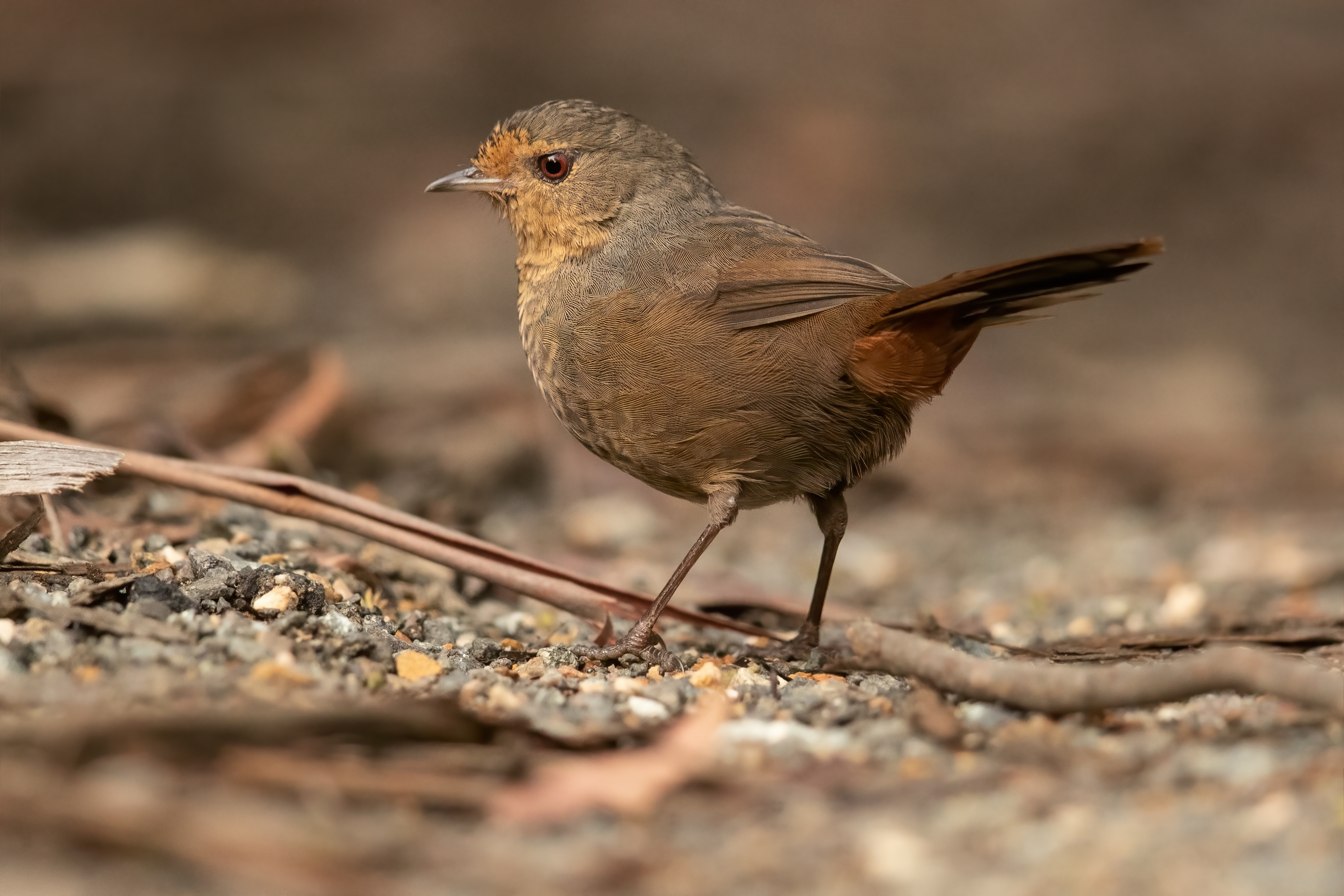
- Pilotbird, Blue Mountains

Conservation status
- Vulnerable (IUCN 3.1)

Scientific classification
- Kingdom: Animalia
- Phylum: Chordata
- Class: Aves
- Order: Passeriformes
- Family: Acanthizidae
- Genus: Pycnoptilus; Gould, 1851
- Species: P. floccosus

Binomial name
- Pycnoptilus floccosus Gould, 1851

Subspecies
- P. f. sandlandi - Mathews, 1912; P. f. floccosus - Gould, 1851
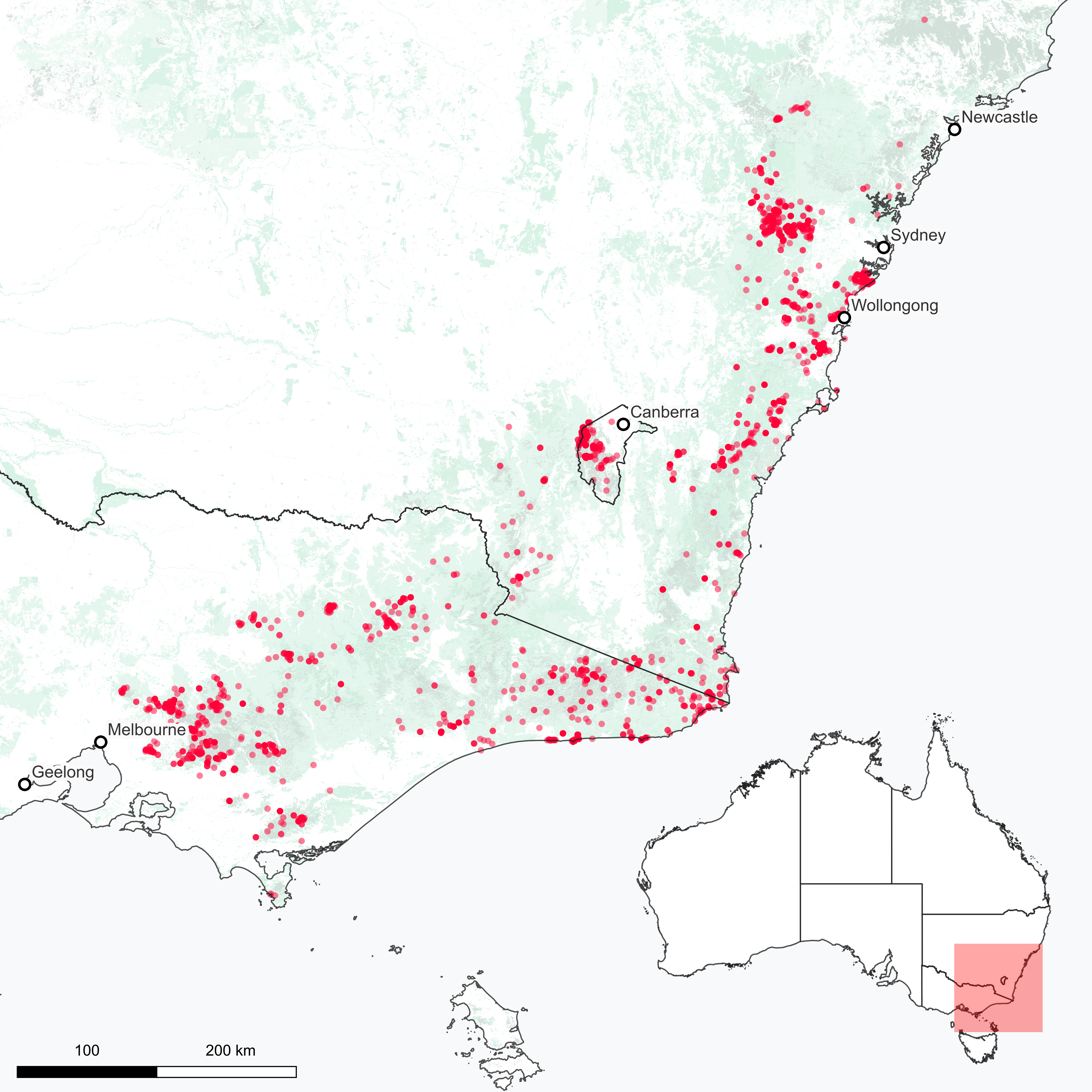
- Species distribution

= Pilotbird =

Monotypic genus of Australian bird

The pilotbird (Pycnoptilus floccosus) is a species of passerine bird in the family Acanthizidae. It is monotypic within the genus Pycnoptilus. The species is endemic to south-eastern Australia.

== Taxonomy ==
The species was first described by English ornithologist John Gould in 1851. The generic name Pycnoptilus derives from the Ancient Greek pyknos 'thick' and ptilon 'feather'. Its specific epithet floccosus is Late Latin for 'flocked with wool'. There are two subspecies: the nominate subspecies Pycnoptilus floccosus floccosus lives in alpine areas; and P. f. sandfordi lives in lowland forest.

== Description ==
The pilotbird is a large, plump species of acanthizid, measuring around 18 centimetres (7.1 in) in length and weighing 27 grams (0.95 oz). The plumage of the underparts is reddish-brown with scalloping on the chest and the centre of the belly speckled dull white. The upperparts are chocolate-brown. The bill is short and finely pointed. Its tail is broad and semi-erect, and flicked up and down when feeding.

== Distribution and habitat ==
The pilotbird is found from the Wollemi National Park and Blue Mountains National Park in New South Wales through to the Dandenong Ranges, near Melbourne in Victoria. Its natural habitat is temperate wet sclerophyll forests and occasionally temperate rainforest, where there is dense undergrowth with abundant debris. It is sedentary and common.

== Behaviour ==
Its name comes from its supposed habit of following lyrebirds, taking prey that they flush, and also from its call guiding bushmen seeking for lyrebirds. This habit is well known but seldom observed. The pilotbird is highly terrestrial, feeding on or near the ground and when disturbed it runs swiftly on strong legs. Its call has been described as "piercing and sweet". The male makes a far-carrying call of wit-wit-weet-WHEER to which the female may respond with a softer wit-a-wit-ee.

=== Breeding ===
The breeding season for the pilotbird is from August to December. The globular nest is built with a side-entrance and hidden amongst the accumulated debris on the forest floor. It is an untidy construction of bark, ferns, dead leaves and rootlets. A clutch of usually two eggs, each measuring 27 by 20 mm (1.06 by 0.79 in) and varying in colour from grey-green to purple-brown, is incubated by the female for 20–22 days. During the nestling period, which lasts 14–17 days, the male will often feed the female or help with the care of the nestlings, if the female has a subsequent brood. The nests are sometimes parasitised by the fan-tailed cuckoo (Cacomantis flabelliformis).

== Conservation ==
The pilotbird is fairly common within its small range, which has reduced as a result of forest clearance and urban development, but much of its habitat is within national parks or reserves. Its habitat is also threatened by climate change, severe weather and bushfires; nevertheless, the most recent assessment in October 2016 classified the pilotbird as vulnerable on the IUCN Red List. The pilotbird was listed as Vulnerable under the EPBC Act in 2022, in response to the 2019/2020 Australian Bushfires, which burnt 47% of its distribution, and contributed to an estimated 30-50% decline in the population.
