= Pearl Coast Zoological Gardens =

Former zoo in Broome, Western Australia

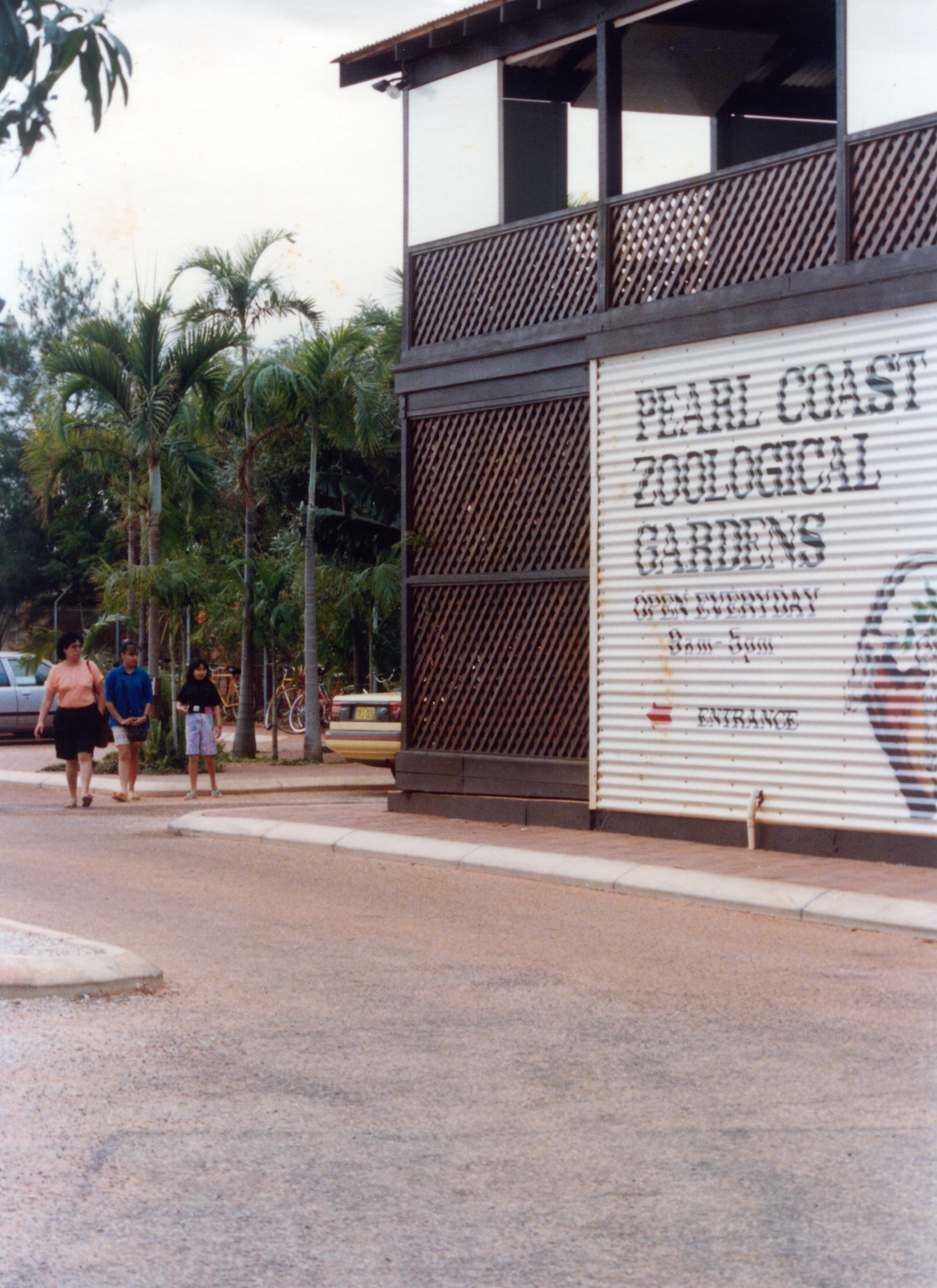
- The entrance to the zoo in 1989
- Interactive map of Pearl Coast Zoological Gardens
- 17.9322°S 122.2140°E
- Date opened: 12 August 1984
- Date closed: early 1990s (some point after 3 December 1992)
- Location: Lullfitz Drive (modern-day Sanctuary Road), Broome, Western Australia
- Land area: 1984: 25 acres (10 ha); 1988: 64 acres (26 ha)
- Annual visitors: upwards of 35,000 visitors a year (in 1989)

Pearl Coast Zoological Gardens, also known as Pearl Coast Zoo, or simply Broome Zoo, was a 64-acre (26 ha) zoo founded by Lord McAlpine of West Green in the Cable Beach suburb of Broome, Western Australia.

First opened in 1984 as the Pearl Coast Wildlife Park, by 1988 the zoo had more than doubled in size. It was one of a number of developments of McAlpine's in the town credited with transforming Broome from a "derelict" place into "an international tourist destination". The zoo ran into financial difficulties in the early 1990s, ostensibly due to falling visitor numbers, and rebranded itself as the Wonderful World of Birds for a period. McAlpine's attorney, however, revealed in late 1992 that the zoo had been running at a loss ever since it had opened. The zoo closed at some point after December 1992, by which point most of the animals had already been sold. At its peak, the zoo consisted of 75 acres, of which 35 acres were built upon.

In 2012, The West Australian described the former zoo as "a lush, tropical oasis ... filled with weird and wonderful exotic animals and a cacophony of bright, colourful birds".

== Background ==
McAlpine, a "quixotic" and "eccentric" wealthy British businessman, first visited Perth in 1960 on the maiden voyage of the SS Oriana. He became involved in property development in the city, including the construction of the Parmelia Hotel. McAlpine visited Broome for the first time in 1974, on the advice of his Perth lawyer, John Adams, who suggested they fly there together in McAlpine's private plane, as part of McAlpine's search for antique farm machinery to collect.

McAlpine was taken by the town, although he described it as derelict. According to a 2018 interview with Sue Thom (guest relations manager at McAlpine's Cable Beach Club Resort since its opening in 1988), upon arriving in Broome, McAlpine went to look at sea shells and later rendezvoused with the rest of his party at the Roebuck Bay Hotel for lunch. Midway through the meal, he announced that he had already bought his first property in the town, reputedly having signed the deal on a beer coaster at the Roey pub.

=== Broome development ===
After that initial visit, McAlpine enthusiastically began purchasing large landholdings in the area, at one point owning more than 20 properties. He undertook several development projects, drawing in his experience with property development since his time in Perth.

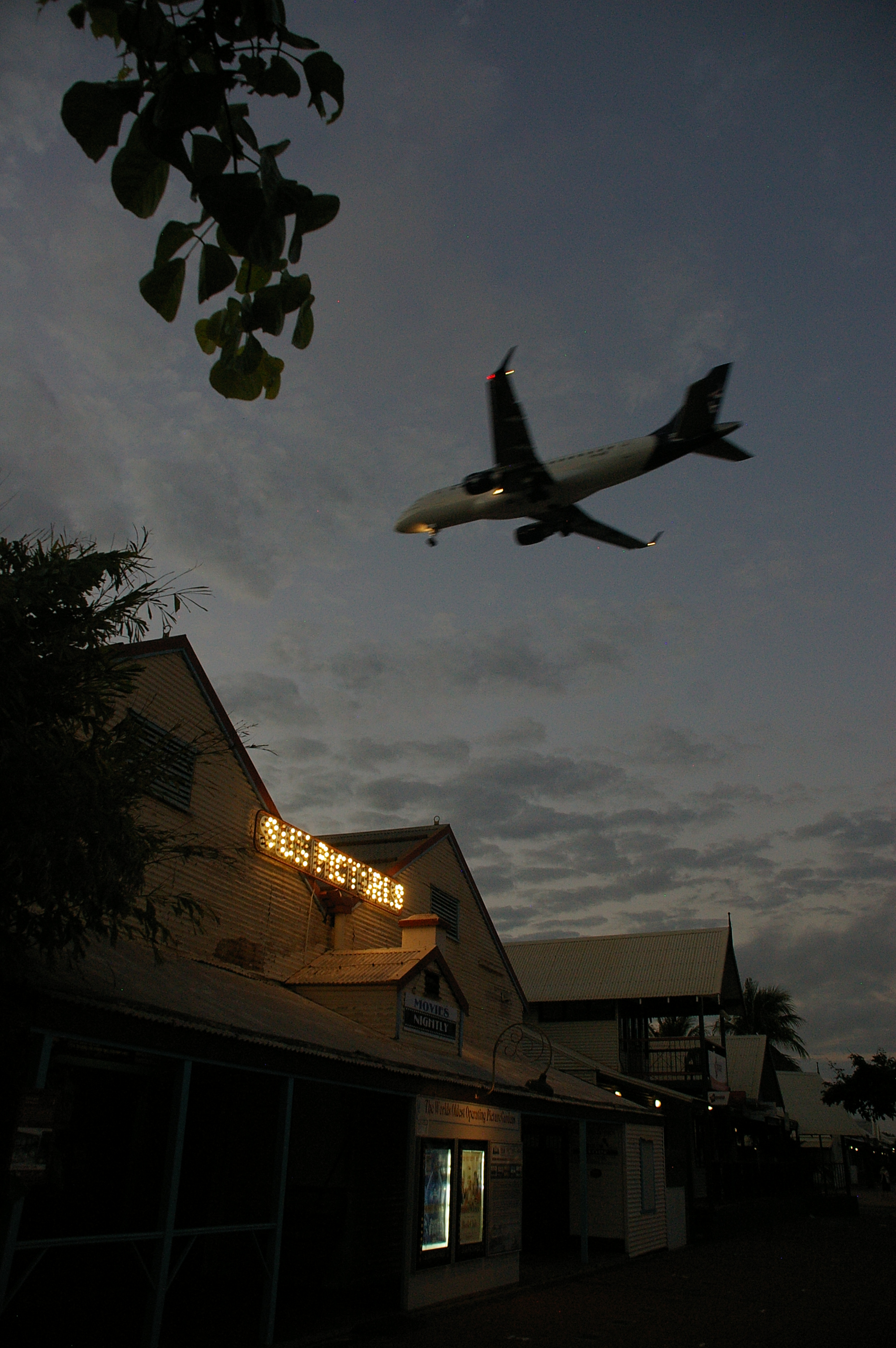
A plane descending over Sun Picture Gardens towards Broome International Airport, 2018

In 1982, McAlpine purchased McAlpine House, which became his residence in Broome for more than a decade, where he planted an extensive tropical garden, with aviaries housing exotic birds, including his prized eclectus parrots. By 1984, the house was described by Broome News as "one of (Broome's) showcase residential homes" with grounds "...packed with exotic plants and wildlife from all over the world". It was in that context that McAlpine's idea for a wildlife attraction in Broome originated, resulting in the opening of the Pearl Coast Wildlife Park in 1984, later renamed the Pearl Coast Zoological Gardens.

At the time of the zoo's construction, Broome was still a very isolated outpost with "hardly any shipping, the last piece of road between Halls Creek and Broome was still dirt track, (and) freezer trucks had just started to come through", according to Thom. In this unlikely location, McAlpine chose to build "a zoo filled with endangered and exotic animals", confident that it would attract tourists.

Conscious that potential visitors to Broome would have limited accommodation options, McAlpine also purchased land at Cable Beach, where he oversaw the establishment of the town's first luxury accommodation, the 600-bed Cable Beach Club Resort, a joint venture between the Western Australian Development Corporation (WADC) and McAlpine's own company Australian City Properties (ACP). The club was opened in 1988 to coincide with the celebration of Australia's bicentenary.

What is now the Cable Beach Club Resort & Spa was at that point "just a caravan park and paddock" on the headland, according to Thom. McAlpine spent AUD $55 million (at 1987 prices) developing the resort, hoping to develop Broome as a tourist destination for visitors from Australia as well as overseas. McAlpine's low-rise, largely timber resort was the antithesis to what other developers such as Christopher Skase were building on the east coast in places such as Port Douglas, Cairns and the Gold Coast. According to Lyn Page, a former employee of McAlpine's, his motives for developing the Club on the site were not entirely commercial however:

Alistair's office was on the top floor of where Willie Creek Pearls are now. He overlooked the Bali Hai caravan park which was an eyesore, and every time Alistair drove past it he saw it as a personal affront. He loathed it. He figured that the only way to do something about it was to buy it which he did, and proceeded to develop the Cable Beach Club...

The journalist Hugh Edwards, writing in the 2000s, noted that not everybody in Broome was happy with what McAlpine was doing in the mid to late-1980s:

There was a group in town strongly opposed to any changes to Broome. They were suspicious and perhaps envious at what they saw as too much money in one person's hands. They had an egalitarian dislike of anyone with the title of Lord. They called themselves 'Conservationists' but in reality they were conservatives to whom any change was anathema. They opposed his every move with protests to Council and Government. While they made life difficult, McAlpine recognised that it was part of living in a democracy, and he persevered as he was entitled to, in his own right.

Authors Anne Coombs and Susan Varga, writing in 2001, noted that attitudes towards McAlpine in Broome at the time were still sharply divided, with many resenting him for the "rapid growth of the town and the influx of visitors who overtook Broome".

According to the Australian Financial Review, many of Broome's present heritage buildings "owe their current existence and reinvention (as cafes, restaurants, art galleries) to McAlpine's wallet and passions" at this time. Some buildings, such as the microbrewery and restaurant Matso's Broome Brewery, "were physically transported from their original locations when it would have been far cheaper to build replicas". McAlpine also helped to preserve the Sun Picture Gardens. According to Ron 'Sos' Johnston, a town councillor in the year 2000, "We owe Alistair a hell of a lot for the preservation of the architecture of Broome. His presence kept the other developers out."

In an official guidebook for the Pearl Coast Zoo published in 1988, the appeal of Broome to the prospective visitor was described thus: "Although pearling is still an important activity, Broome has evolved from these origins to become a popular tourist destination. The special appeal of the town is due to many factors including: its splendid, sub-tropical climate; the distinctive character of its architecture; the magnificent wide, sandy beaches with vivid aqua-blue ocean and relaxed lifestyle of its people".

=== Malcolm Douglas Crocodile Park ===
In the 2000 book Why Broome?, Malcolm Douglas recounted how he had flown from Perth to Broome in 1978 to purchase a "very cheap block on land for sale on Lullfitz Drive." Douglas was aware that "if Broome was to become a tourist location, there needed to be tourist attractions like a croc park", and initially wanted ten acres on the corner of Cable Beach Road and Lullfitz Drive on which to develop this venture. After much discussion with Broome Council, he was eventually granted a lease (starting in 1978) for just two and a half acres on the site. By 1983, Douglas noted that "pressure was put on me to either develop the block in Broome or let it go", adding:

In 1984, I collected 11 crocs from Kalumburu and brought them back to a couple of pens I had built on the block. Lord McAlpine was building the zoo at the same time. I finally gave him the reptile licence I had and, in return, he undertook not to have crocs in the zoo. The zoo unfortunately closed in the early 1990s, but we are still expanding."

As of 2026, the Malcolm Douglas Crocodile Park still exists in Broome, although it has moved to a different location than its initial siting in Cable Beach.

== Pearl Coast Wildlife Park ==
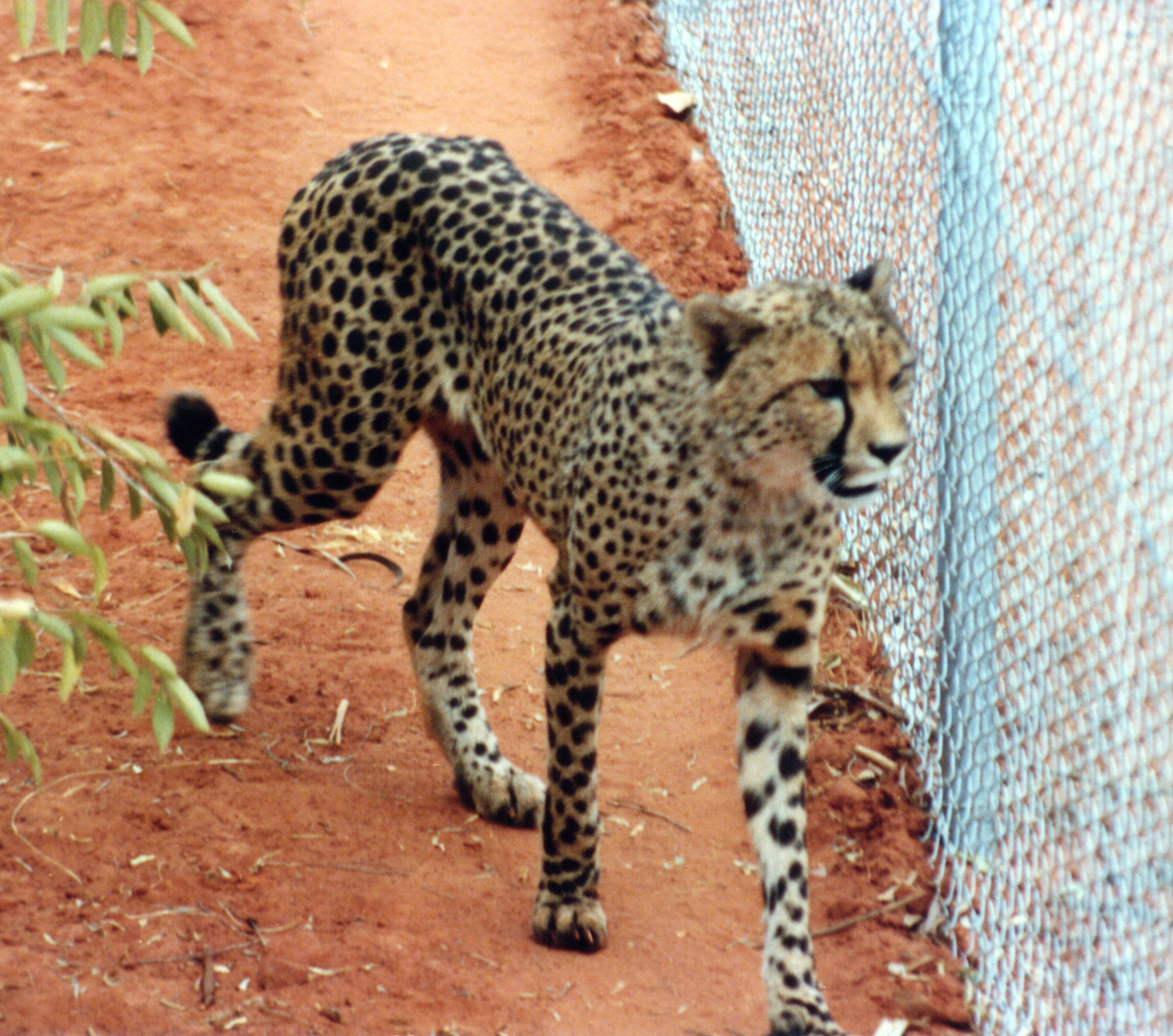
One of a pair of cheetahs on display at the zoo in 1989

McAlpine's Pearl Coast Wildlife Park, the initial name for what would eventually become the Pearl Coast Zoo, was officially opened on Sunday 12 August 1984. The September 1984 edition of Broome News (at that point the town's only newspaper) reported on the opening thus:

"The new Pearl Coast Wildlife Park... is a $350,000 donation to the Broome community and the tourist industry of the north, according to Mr. Dowding. Mr. Dowding opened the park on behalf of the Premier (of Western Australia), and said that Lord McAlpine, who financed the venture, had made a unique philanthropic gesture to the people of Broome. "Lord McAlpine has already spent a fortune developing the project and by the time it is finished the investment will be over $1m." Mr. Dowding said. "I cannot remember anyone previously making a financial commitment like this in Broome with no thought of profit or return on their investment"

"As I designed my zoo, I made the enclosures far larger than necessary - not for the sake of the animals but rather to make people feel better about visiting these animals. The downside of this was that, although the number and variety of my mammals steadily increased, I used to get complaints from people who had walked around the whole place without seeing any animals."

— Extract from McAlpine's 2002 memoir, Adventures Of A Collector

McAlpine, then 42 years old, was at that point reputed to have been amongst the top six wealthiest people in the United Kingdom. By the time of the opening of the park, McAlpine also was in possession of his own private zoo in London, but unlike his Broome venture was not open to the public. Speaking to Peter W. Lewis of Broome News in 1984, McAlpine explained the reasons for his opening of the park: "My motivation for establishing the Pearl Coast Wildlife Park was that I love animals, and many of the animals you have in the Kimberlies (sic) just could not survive in the United Kingdom... We have not finished (the park) yet. All the profits from the Park will be poured back into it. I hope to obtain crocodiles and other reptiles, so that it will become an education centre for both children and adults".

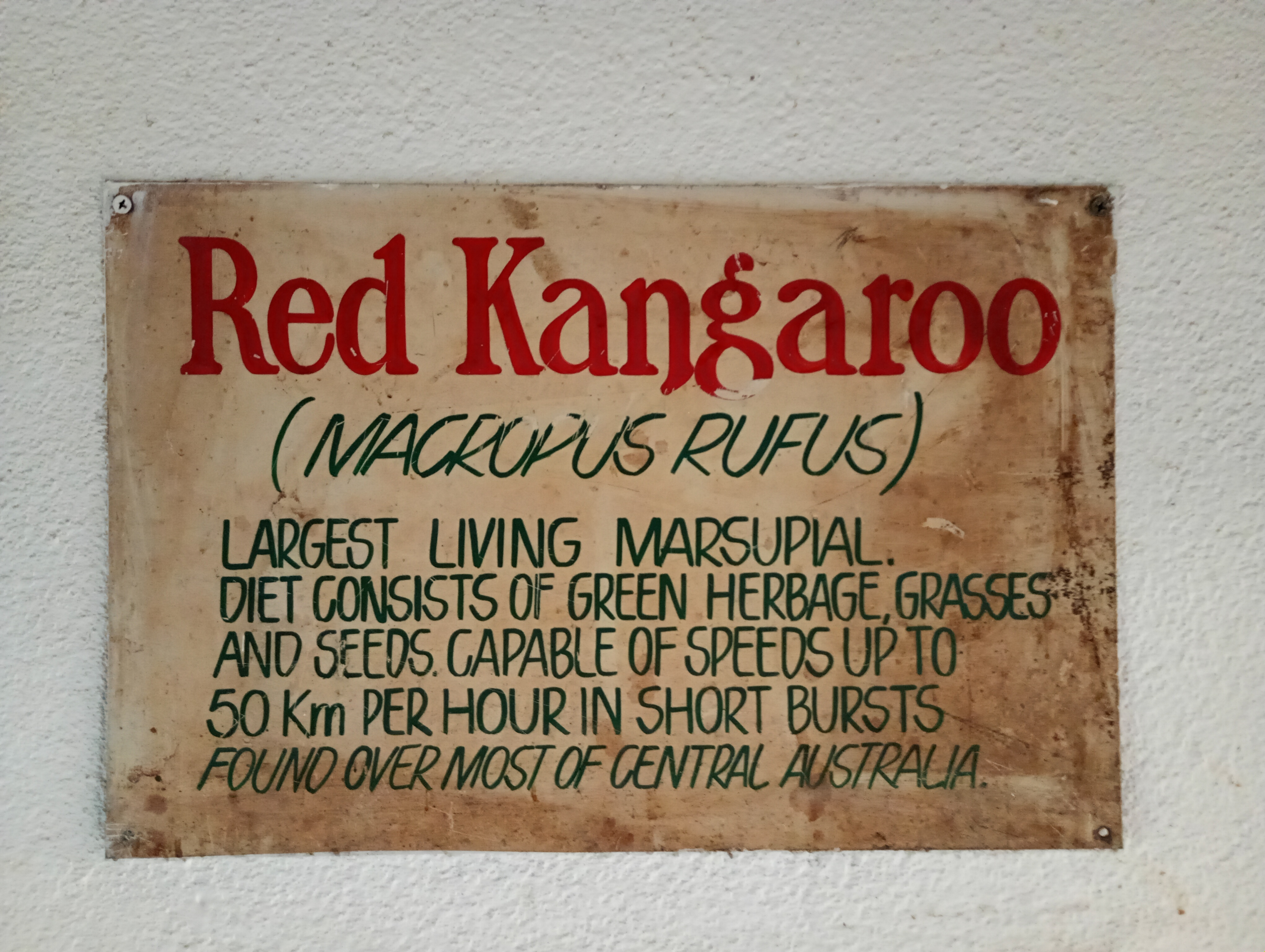
An original hand-written sign from the zoo, now on display in Zookeepers Broome café

The park initially housed only kangaroos, camels and wallabies and covered a total of 25 acres (10 hectares). It is known that the park also occasionally took donations of animals, as by 1988 it was published that a grey kangaroo named "Sheeba" was actually a pet who had been donated. Full-page advertisements for the Wildlife Park were published in the Broome News at first, offering the visitor the chance to see kangaroos, wallabies, emus, water buffalo, camels, antelopes, swans, colourful parrots and "many other native birds", with a publicity photo of "singer Dianne Hammond" feeding one of the parks fallow deer. The "latest arrivals" were advertised as being "Banteng wild cattle from the feral population of the Cobourg Peninsula" (in the Northern Territory), "now classed as rare and endangered in the wild". The opening hours were listed as 09:00 to 16:00, Mon-Sun with an entrance fee of $3 for adults, and $1.50 for children (aged 4–14 years). The address was listed as "Lullfitz Drive, off the Cable Beach Road near Cable Beach".

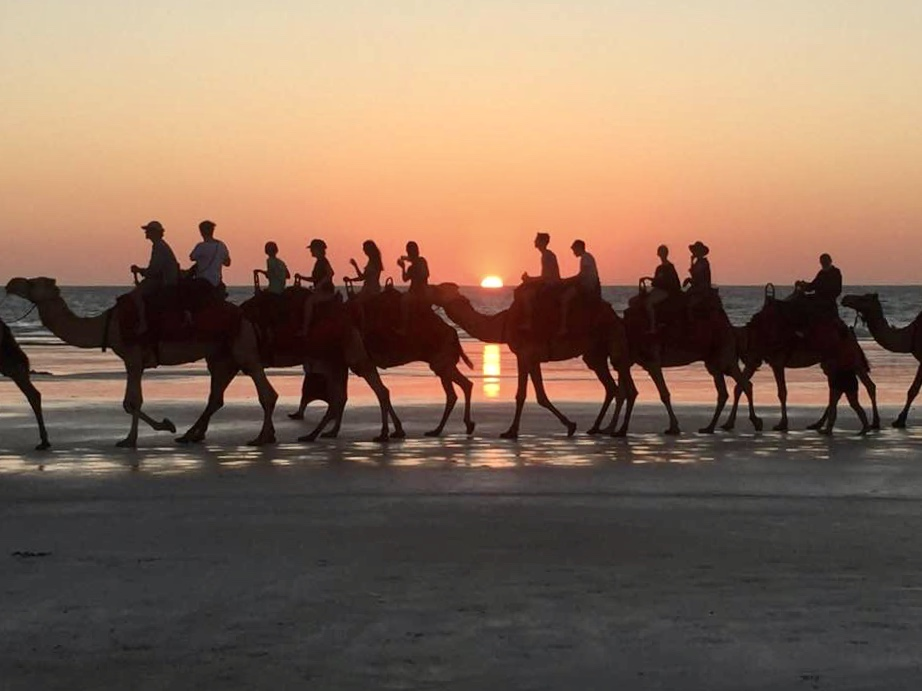
Tourists riding camels on Cable Beach at sunset

McAlpine's development of the wildlife park reflected his passion for gardens and animals, and in his mind acted as a sanctuary for the rare species he brought there which would otherwise have been at harm from industrial development, hunting or civil war. The similarity of the Broome landscape to parts of Africa from which many of the animals were taken was also a major factor in the choosing of Broome as the site for his park. It was still, however, a challenge to adapt the dry bushland to the needs of a wide variety of animals, and according to a 1988 guidebook took "several years of hard work together with an imaginative and positive approach" to produce what would eventually become the Pearl Coast Zoological Gardens.

On 27 March 1985, the Kimberley Field Naturalist Society was established at the 'General Office' of the Pearl Coast Wildlife Park by a group of 20 amateur naturalists from Broome, Derby, Kununurra and even as far away as Tasmania. Special thanks were extended to Ross Gardiner and Lord Alistair McAlpine for the provision of the meeting facilities, and the group aimed to assist in the conservation of the Kimberley's natural resources through their ventures.

By May 1985, the opening hours of the Wildlife Park had increased from 09:00 until 18:00, Monday to Sunday, but by June 1985 had reduced an hour from 09:00 until 17:00. A "Special Feature" at the park, consisting of "Native and Feral Fauna of the Kimberley Region", was advertised in the local paper.

In the July 1985 edition of Broome News, Lester Knight, an RSPCA inspector, noted the fast-growing hobby of aviculture which was evident in Broome, "mostly likely on account of the wonderful display of exotic and native birds which are to be seen at the Pearl Coast Wildlife Park and other permitted collections in the area".

In August 1985, it was reported that the Council had advised the Department of Lands and Surveys that it supported Lord McAlpine's application in buying additional land to expand his wildlife park and "the proposed by-pass road route". A month later, in September 1985, a full-page advertisement in the Broome News announced the latest animals to arrive to the wildlife park: "colourful macaws from South America (the only macaws in W.A.)".

In October 1985, Broome News ran a six-page interview with McAlpine, styled as 'The Lord McAlpine of West Green', in which questions relating to the future development of north-western Australia as well as his Wildlife Park were posed. Journalist Ieva Tomsons mentioned that the park was much improved since its opening, to which McAlpine replied: "I've spent an enormous amount of, there is an enormous amount of me in it. It's going to be much more interesting and I want to go into other things here. I want to be able to show small mammals of the Kimberley which people never get to see because they are mostly nocturnal and also the sea-life".

The possibility of building a simulated reef at the park was mooted by McAlpine, adding "All that sort of thing I want to do here, but first of all you have to start off with the spectacular sort of things that the public can see. The number of people who will visit the nocturnal house (in the next 10 years) will be very small, or the number that will spend any time looking at these animals will be very small. It doesn't make them cross the road, whereas buffalo do".

=== Veterinary expertise ===
In 1985, McAlpine first met local vet Dave Morrell while on a weekend break with his wife at One Arm Point, whereupon they shared a softball game at Cygnet Bay Pearl Farm with Morrell and his wife. Morrell was heavily involved at the time with a programme of tuberculosis eradication in cattle across the West Kimberley, while also running a veterninary clinic in Broome, and a weekly clinic in Derby. McAlpine told Morrell of his zoo plans, the ambition of which Morrell didn't appreciate at first:

I found out later that he had some kangaroos and some bantengs but it was fairly basic. He then started to bring in more exotic species such as oryx and it was obvious that he needed some veterinary attention. The manager of the zoo at the time wasn't talking to me as he obviously had a vet in Perth with whom he had a rapport. I made an appointment with Alistair when he was back in town. I was honest with him and said that initially I didn't think he was serious about a real zoo but that I could now see what he was doing...

Some time later, Morrell approached McAlpine to see if he would be interested in hiring him, admitting that while he didn't know much about these exotic species, if McAlpine gave him a chance he would be an asset to the zoo. Later in 1985, McAlpine hired Morrell on a retainer agreement with the two agreeing an hourly rate, and Morrell designed a vet clinic for the zoo, which was "fairly basic, two rooms with some equipment."

The zoo had the largest bird collection in the southern hemisphere at the time, and McAlpine's aim was to breed from the birds and animals contained therein. To do this, sexing the birds was a necessity, although as Morrell explained "what was difficult was the fact that you couldn't tell the difference between the male and the female just by looking at them, which you can do with most birds." The zoo had to purchase an endoscope for this purpose, as well as bringing in highly specialised instruments and drugs which were available to very few vets in Australia at the time. McAlpine also paid for educational work trips for Morrell's development:

This type of work really excited me. At my own expense I went over East to learn how to surgically sex birds in places like Taronga Park Zoo in Sydney. Alistair then asked me to go to America to check out the zoos over there armed with a gold American Express card. I spent a couple of months there working in San Diego Animal Park and their zoos which were just phenomenal places. I also spent a couple of weeks working with a superb bird vet in Chicago. With that sort of hands-on experience my skills improved quite a lot.

Reminiscing about the work at the zoo, Morrell described in 2002 performing his first caesarean on a Congo buffalo - "the only female Congo buffalo in Australia", which contrasted to his prior work on cattle stations in the Kimberley where the owner wouldn't ordinarily call a vet to perform a caesarean as the calf would not be worth the cost. Morell also recalled his "worst experience" is operating on a "magnificent kudu" whose hooves had become overgrown: "I shot it with a dart gun so that I could get close to it. Unfortunately, under anaesthesia, it regurgitated its food, got pneumonia and died from it." Morrell described having learnt from the incident to always lift an animal's head high in order to prevent them from regurgitating into their lungs in such cases.

=== Land acquisition ===
In the aforementioned October 1985 McAlpine interview, it was mentioned that he was "still battling" with the Lands Department over his desire to buy more land around his wildlife park, but that the issue was "over the terms not the principle." He added "The land that I want around this area is some 20 acres, around the back here to extend my Park. This land across the way, Jack Kimberley's land came up for sale and I bought it because it's convenient for me to have a piece of land to quarantine animals which is not absolutely within the Park. It's also that I need another house and really it's cheaper to buy the land and the house than to build. I'm already building two more houses for staff and I need a third one". McAlpine explained "I like housing people because I think that you get better people".

In February 1992, when the Broome Shire Council began considering the option to rezone the zoo land for another purpose, Western Australian Planning Minister David Smith explained to a journalist the process by which McAlpine had initially acquired it:

...the lots were allocated to Lord McAlpine, initially as special leases with freehold conversion available subject to satisfactory development and payment of purchase price. "The further land bought was for extensions to the zoo," he said. "Prices for the lots were established by the Valuer General." Mr Smith said Lord McAlpine had paid a total of $730,000 for freehold leases on 51.6 hectares.

=== Water supply ===
When asked in October 1985 about the water table in the Cable Beach area, McAlpine defended his use of water at the park, stating "My system of watering is the most economic. Actually I use much less water than almost anyone in this district because virtually all my water, with the exception of the front lawn [..] is dribble (drip irrigation). Most of the plants in the Park are native which don't need a colossal amount of water." On the subject of the lakes which McAlpine was intending to create in the park, he assured "There is very little evaporation in the lakes because we have fountains which cool the water so that there is very little loss by evaporation. Bit (sic) of loss by seepage but presumably that goes on down."

McAlpine was against the installation of an artesian bore at the time of being interviewed, as he believed he wouldn't need "anything like that quantity of water", clarifying:

"I've got two bores on this property and think I take out about 10,000 gallons a year, it's a very, very small quantity of water to take out. I am putting in a garden at the far end because I have to grow fruit for the birds, a lot of birds need specialist fruit. I will put some sort of gadget on the pipe to reduce salinity, but my water here is only 800 parts per million so it's perfectly tolerable. There is a chronic water problem around Broome but my particular piece of it is reasonably good. On the 25 acres I've got, I've got two bores."

Three years later in 1988, however, the official guidebook of the zoo explained their use of water at that point, with the noting of "an artesian source":

"...rainfall is unreliable in the Broome area. The Zoo's water supply is provided by an artesian source 800 metres below ground. As it has a high content of iron and salt, the water must be treated by a desalination process before it is acceptable for use by animals or irrigation. The treated water is pumped into a series of man-made lakes and ponds within the Zoo. The largest lake has an area of over 13,000 square metres and has been skilfully constructed so as to blend into the landscape. In addition to serving the Zoo's permanent inhabitants, it attracts many of the migratory birds, which include waders that fly south from Siberia and Scandinavia".

=== Further animal acquisition ===
In his 2002 memoir, Adventures Of A Collector, McAlpine addressed his "collecting instinct" which drove the expansion of the zoo:

At first I was occupied in setting up cages and creating landscapes with rocks and trees. I enjoyed the physical work and was delighted with my small collection of animals and birds. Each evening at sunset, I would walk around the enclosures looking at all the creatures, many of whom were hand-tame. I fed many of the birds with the bird food from a bag that I carried. Soon, however, the collecting instinct took over. More cages were built to house a growing collection. The feral donkeys went and scimitar-horned oryx came.

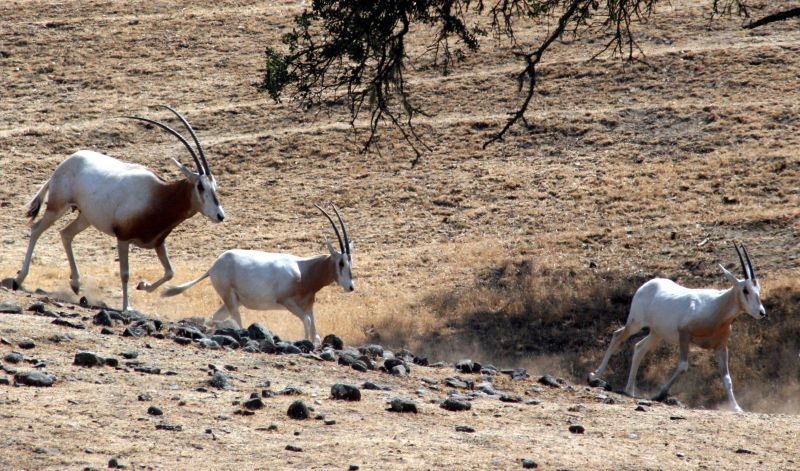
Scimitar-horned oryx photographed in the wild

From the late 1980s, "a steady stream of animals were trucked and flown to Broome", according to The West Australian, including oryx, addax, sitatunga and zebra. Within five years of opening, the zoo was home to Australia's "best collection of Australian parrots and African exotics". In 1989, the zoo's 280 aviaries contained more than 80 varieties of birds, including the rare palm cockatoo, South American macaws and eclectus parrots. McAlpine invested millions of Australian dollars into a bird breeding program, which eventually supplied zoos all over the world with rare birds.

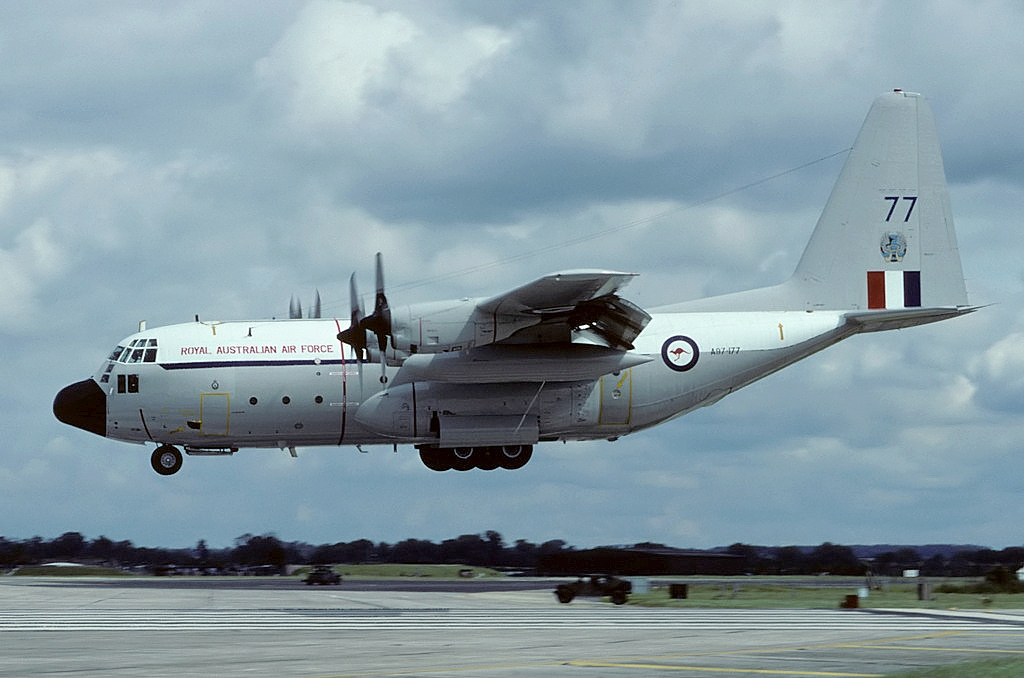
An RAAF Hercules in 1991

According to the zoo's 1988 guidebook, the first exotic species (other than camels, kangaroos and wallabies) to enter the zoo were scimitar-horned oryx, imported from Marwell Zoological Park in Hampshire, England in 1987.

"Alistair chartered a wide-bodied jet to load them on while I sorted the animals and helped supervise the loading of the plane (..) An experienced zookeeper from Marwell Zoo and I sat at the back of the plane. I could barely squeeze past the boxes to get to the front of the plane while sloshing through the river of urine on the floor."

— Vet Dave Morrell describing the transport of animals via plane in the 2002 book And Why Broome?

Zoo vet Dave Morrell was involved with this trip to England to transport the animals to Broome, and spent a month living at McAlpine's house in Little College Street, London. As part of the project, animals were collected from Marwell Zoo as well as Whipsnade Zoo in Bedfordshire, before being flown in a chartered jet to Canada, Hawaii, New Zealand and then Perth, from where the animals were transported by land. None of the 50-60 exotic animals died en route.

John Knowles, the Director of Marwell Zoo was pictured in the guidebook walking around Pearl Coast Zoo on a site inspection with members of staff. A number of Nyala antelope were also brought from Marwell Zoo around the same time. "Since then there has been a constant flow of new arrivals from all over the world" the guidebook continued, "the most recent being a pair of pygmy hippopotamuses who are on breeding loan from Melbourne Zoo". The hippos were flown into Broome onboard an RAAF Hercules plane. A November 1990 article in New Idea magazine confirmed that they had produced a male baby.

A breeding pair of greater kudu were brought to the zoo in 1987; at the time the only members of the species in Australia.

The journalist Hugh Edwards wrote in the 2000s that:

For a time the zoo went well. There were literally hundreds of birds and animals. That meant that there were rows of cages to build, lakes to be dug for aquatic fish and bird life. The problem was that each species of animals naturally had to be fed a particular diet. Herbivores were different from dingoes, cockatoos different from bats and bandicoots. That required zookeepers who knew how to look after animals. Experts have never come cheaply.

=== Wilderness resort plan for Derby ===
In the June 1987 edition of Broome News, it was reported that McAlpine was expecting to begin "two major tourist projects in the West Kimberley during 1987":

A start will be made on the proposed tourist village on the outskirts of Derby, also a second major wilderness resort is being planned at Walcott Inlet on the West Kimberley coast... Details of the wilderness resort at Walcott Inlet have not yet been released. However, the resort is believed to be modelled on a similar resort development by Lord McAlpine in Africa. Guests will be flown into the resort, and will enjoy the unique scenic wildlife, flora and fishing attractions of the area via special nature paths... The two new McAlpine resorts, and others he is planning at gorges along the Gibb River represent the first major tourist developments in the West Kimberley and can be expected to focus international tourist interest on this unique area.

== Pearl Coast Zoological Gardens ==
In 1988, a 60-paged A4-sized guidebook was published by the park/zoo, entitled "Pearl Coast Zoo", aimed at providing an insight into the development of the establishment and the daily activities onsite. In its introduction (and title), the premises was no longer described as a "wildlife park", but rather a "zoo", and explained that it specialised in the acquisition and breeding of rare and endangered species. At that point the zoo housed "more than 1,000 birds and 200 mammals", including, "at time of printing", the "only specimens of red lechwe, gemsbok, nyala, greater kudu, waterbuck and Congo buffalo in the country".

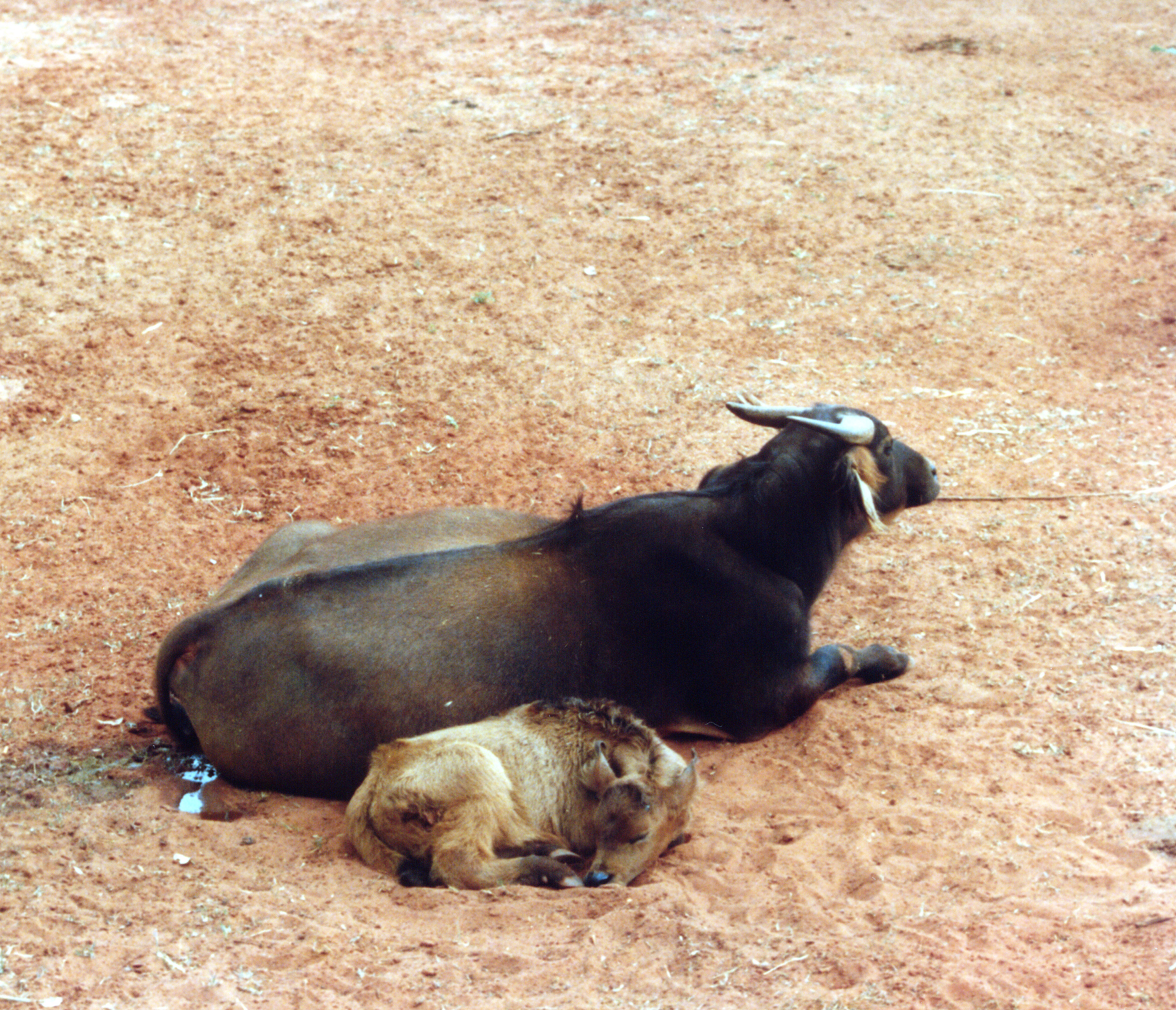
Water buffalo and her calf at the zoo in 1989

The 1988 guidebook was prefaced with a section named "Australia - The Ark" in which the ethos of the zoo was laid out:

Mankind's destruction of the animal kingdom is of worldwide concern... [..] In addressing this problem, Lord McAlpine considers that Australia with its favourable climatic, environmental, and political conditions, has the ability to fulfil the role of an "Ark" for the world's unique and diminishing wildlife. It is upon this philosophy that the Pearl Coast Zoo was established - to provide a sanctuary for the protection and breeding of rare and endangered birds and mammals [..] The simulated natural environment created for the animals at the Pearl Coast Zoo also provides visitors with a wonderful opportunity to view and learn about some of the world's most unique wildlife.

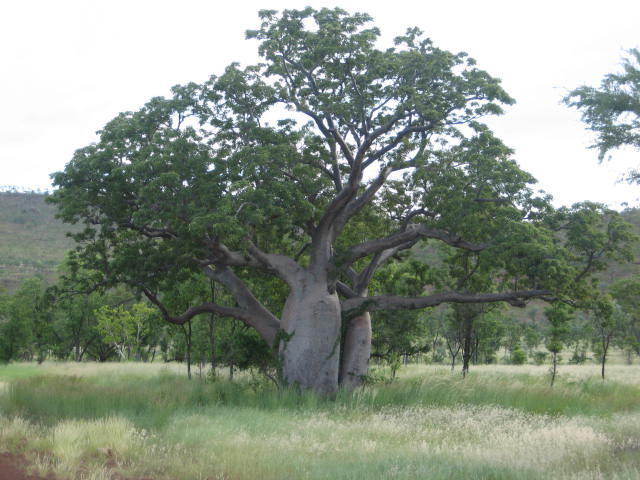
A mature boab tree in the Kimberley

In keeping with the spacious and naturalistic settings that had been created for the animals, only species from the same climatic band as Broome were selected for the Pearl Coast Zoo collection, and for this reason the guidebook explained that animals such as polar bears and Antarctic penguins would not be seen in the park. Boab trees, typical of the Kimberley region, were transplanted to the zoo grounds, having survived "a ten-hour road journey from Derby". To provide protection to the birds from the hot climate, African-style palm-frond thatching was used in the aviaries as roofing material, which was noted as "blending in beautifully with the tropical landscaping of Broome". Overhead sprinklers were also integrated to ensure that birds were kept cool on very hot days. The Palm Cockatoo aviary, at nearly 14 metres high, was specially planned as to allow "full flight travel" for the zoo's rarest (as of 1988) bird, the Great Palm Cockatoo. To create an appropriate environment for the birds, their aviary was landscaped to include a waterfall, pond and a "healthy collection" of Pandanus palms - the kernel of which is a food of the Palm Cockatoo. A corner section of the abandoned palm cockatoo aviary still stood in situ in a corner of unused ground off Koolama Drive as of December 2024.

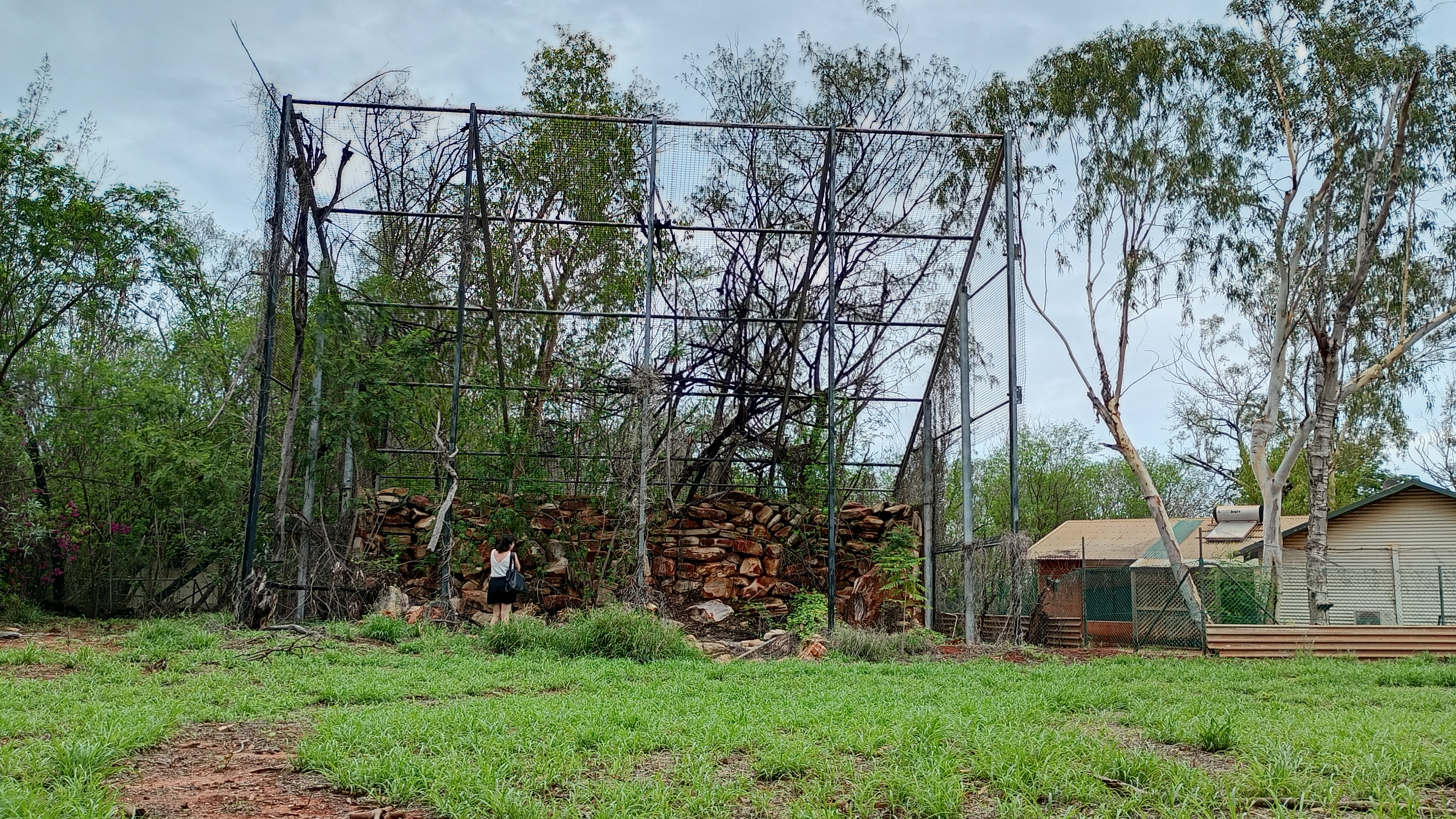
Remains of the palm cockatoo cage, December 2024

The 1988 guidebook claimed that the successful breeding programme at the zoo was a "true indication" that the animals were accepting well to their new environment therein and felt "at home". "With new species of rare and endangered mammals continually arriving", the guidebook stated, "the Zoo has exciting plans for the future [including] a 25 hectare extension to the grounds which will house exhibits for Reptiles, Galapagos Tortoise and Primates" as well as a large walk-through aviary to stand over 20 metres high. A plant nursery was also kept at the zoo, where non-native species could be acclimatised. Future plans at the time included "the propagation and growth of rare and endangered plants".

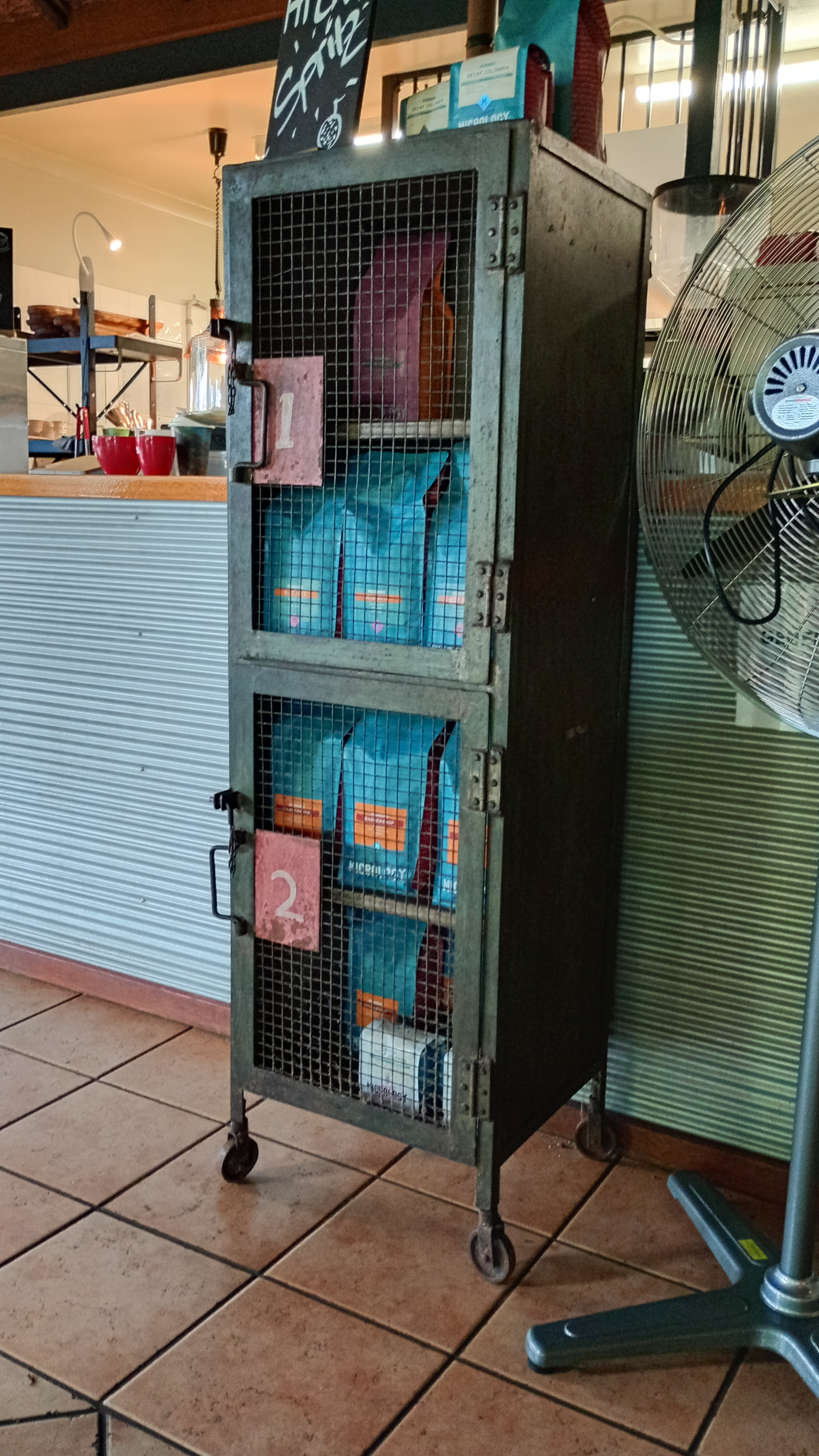
Original metal cabinet from the zoo, now in use at Zookeepers Broome café

The zoo also had a shop, named the Gatehouse, at which art made by local Aboriginal people could be bought. The pieces were sourced from communities in Broome, 'Beagle Bay Mission' (now known simply as Beagle Bay), the Bidyadanga Community (also known as La Grange), and Derby. The guide stated that: "This gives the Zoo a wide variety of authentic artefacts, including shields and stone and wood carvings." In addition to this, carved 'burial posts' used by Aboriginal communities in burial ceremonies on Bathurst and Melville Island were featured in the grounds of the zoo.

A typical day at zoo as of 1988 consisted of an early morning meeting at which staff were briefed on special instructions for the day, followed by the feeding of birds and mammals, and inspection of animals for good health. All food items were at that point freighted from Perth, while the zoo did produce some of its own pelletised feed itself. The zoo had its own veterinary clinic, and veterinarian Dave Morrell, to care for its animals, who were prone to occasionally breaking a wing or leg when frightened or fighting. The vet also attended to injured wildlife brought in for treatment by the public. Animals with ungulated hooves had to be checked regularly for over-growth, at which point the mammal would be anaesthetised for hoof trimming. Other staff at the time included Trevor Gibson (curator of birds), Rose Crowd (office administration), Graham Taylor (manager), Ian Waight (park supervisor) and Chris Mitchell and Damien O'Hara (mammal keepers).

In July 1988, The West Australian noted that 37 individual animals had recently been brought to Broome by McAlpine from four zoos in England. Zoo manager Graham Taylor was quoted as saying that he believed it was the biggest shipment of animals from one part of the world to another: "Logistically, it was a massive exercise... A special Boeing 707 was chartered to move the animals. Usually only racehorses are moved about in this way". The shipment, which had been in preparation for 18 months, involved the animals being flown three days from England to Perth, being quarantined in Perth for a month, and then undergoing a 40-hour truck journey to Broome. Taylor noted that there was a delay of 10 days in the journey as a result of "final papers to be put in order" and "State and Federal permits to be gained and requirements to be met." Taylor was optimistic about the future of the project, noting "The future is bright for Broome and the zoo itself... during the school holidays up to 400 people were visiting the zoo per day. Even now we average around 200 people per day."

=== Zoo collection ===
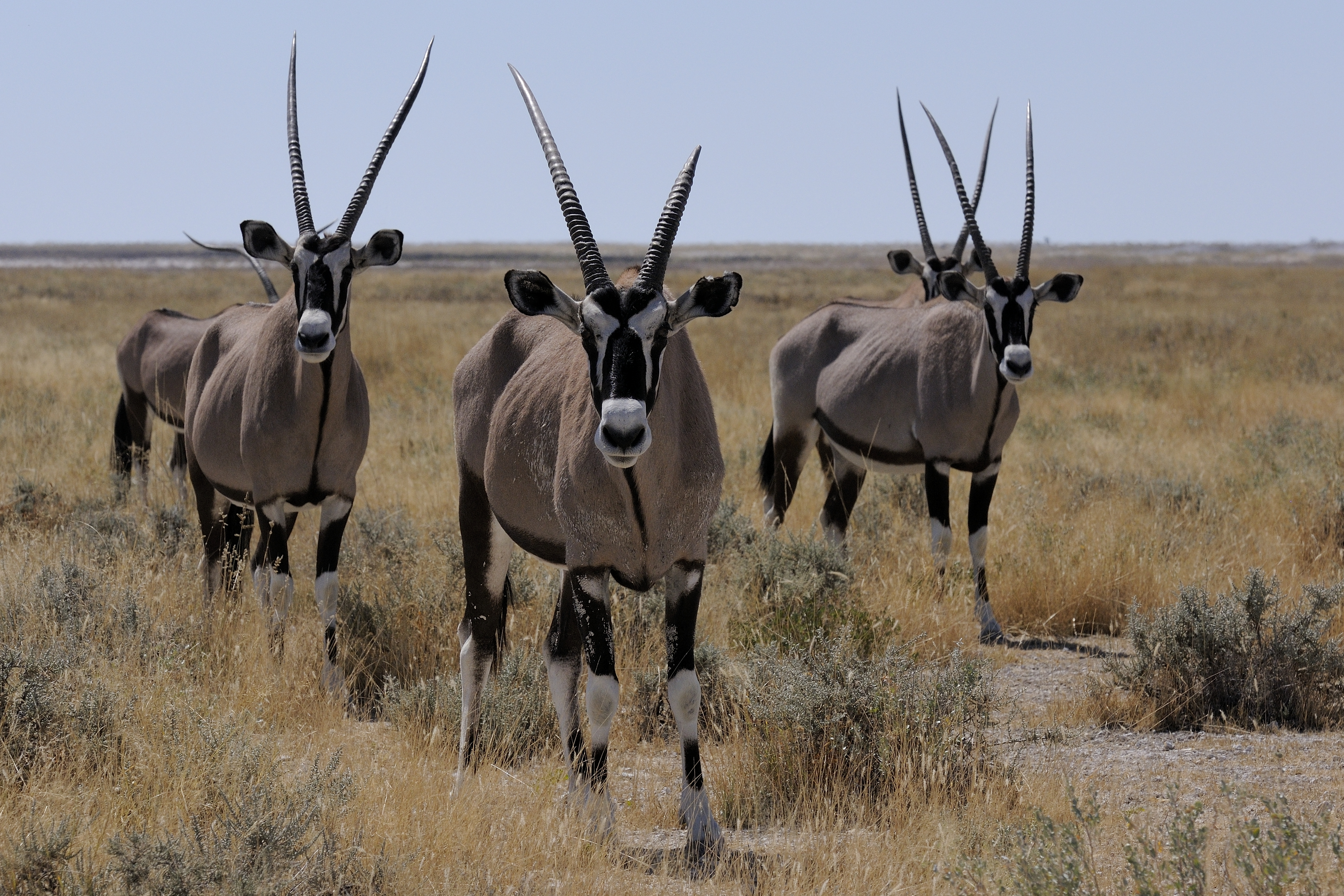
Gemsbok, pictured in Namibia

As of 1988, the zoo's collection of animals included:

- 1,000 birds
- 200 mammals

==== Mammals ====
Species names are as published in the guidebook:

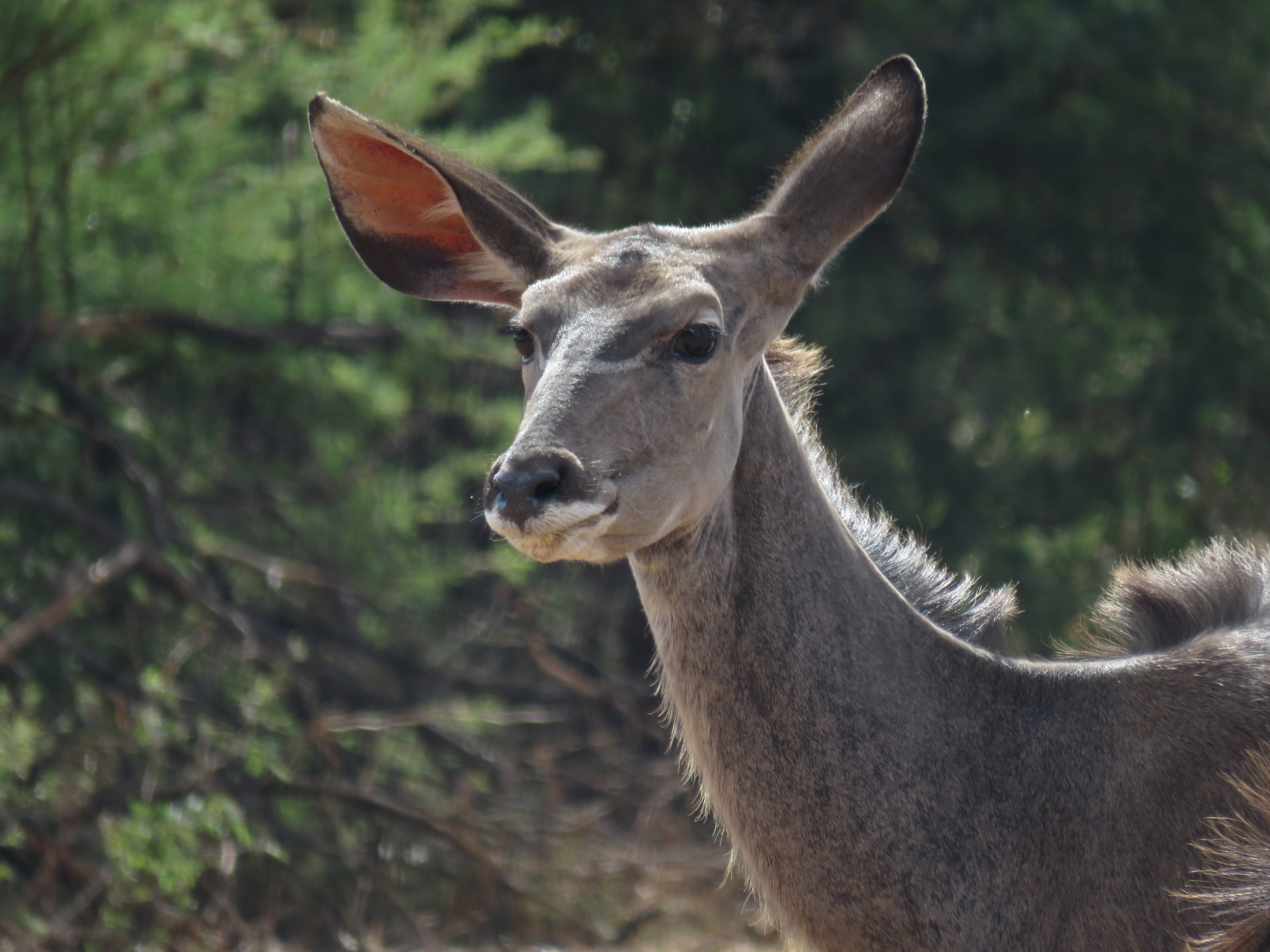
Close-up of a female greater kudu in South Africa

- Scimitar-horned oryx (the "pride of the zoo's mammal collection")
- Gemsbok (the "only zoo in Australia" to have these animals)
- Red lechwe
- Greater kudu
- Sitatunga
- Nyala
- Addax
- Chital
- Grevy's zebra
- Ellipsen waterbuck
- Dromedary camel
- Congo buffalo
- Cheetah
- Water buffalo
- Banteng cattle
- Blackbuck antelope
- Nilgai
- Hog deer
- Javan rusa deer
- Western grey kangaroo
- Red kangaroo
- Euro (aka common wallaroo)
- Nailtail wallaby
- Ground cuscus

==== Birds ====
===== Parrots =====
Species names are as published in the guidebook:

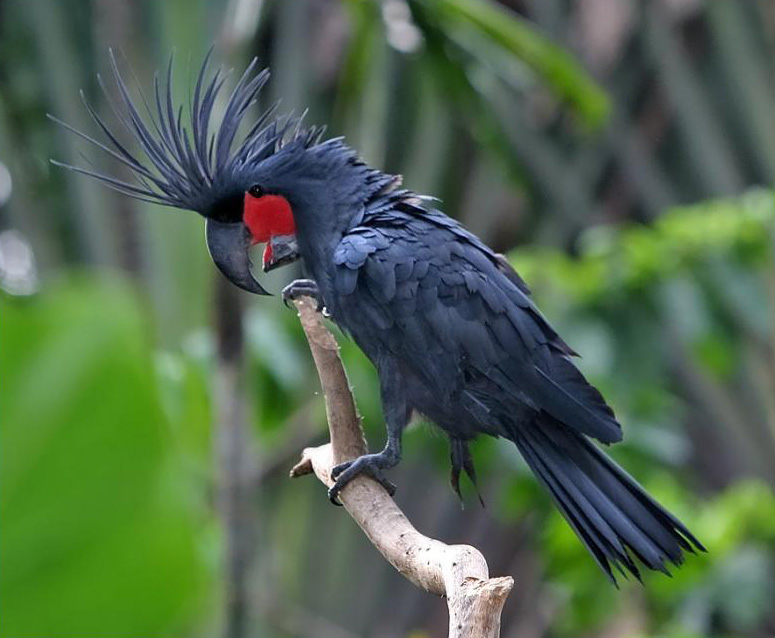
A great palm cockatoo

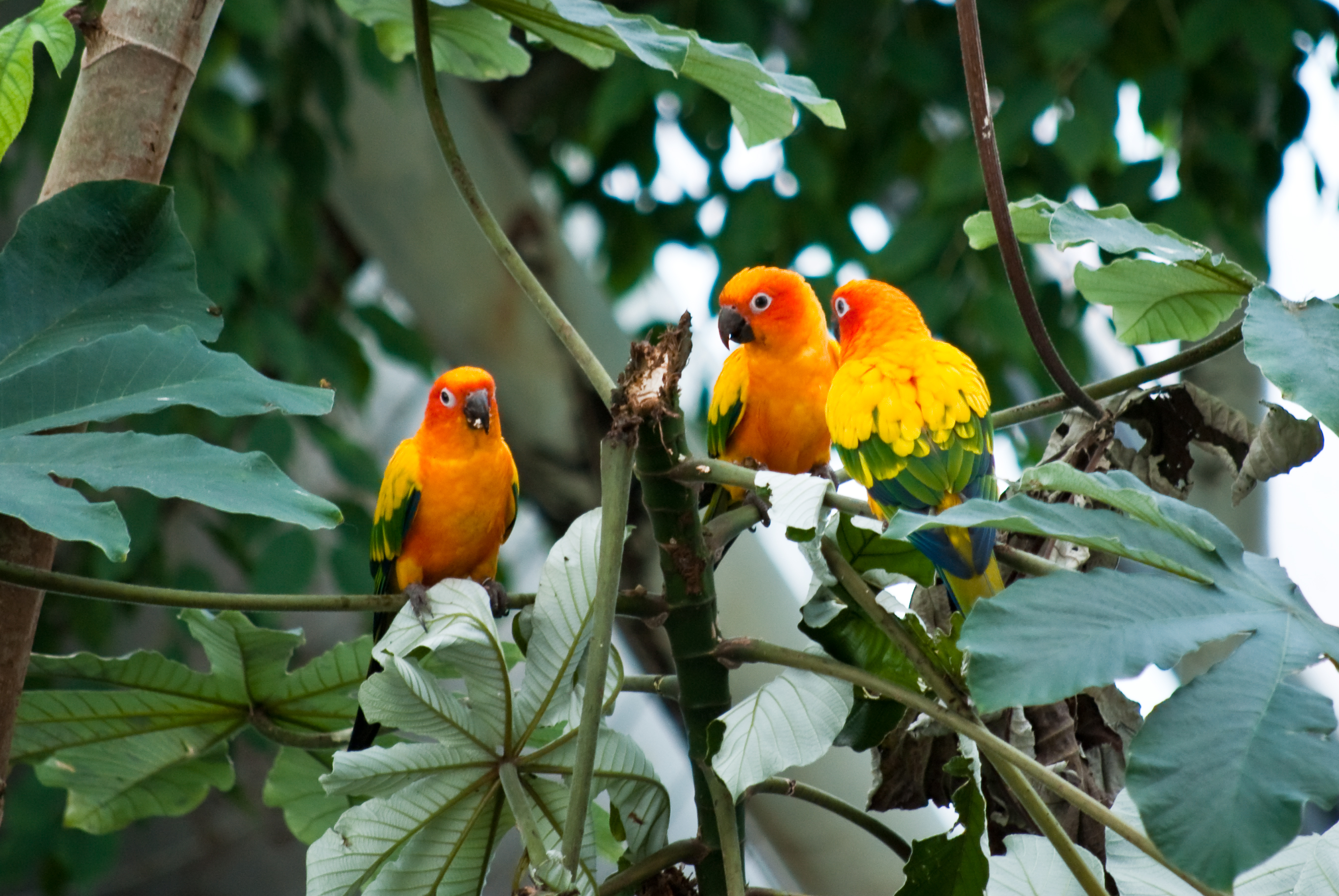
Sun conures in a zoo in Baltimore, USA

- Great palm cockatoo
- Scarlet macaw
- Blue and gold macaw
- Red lory
- Chattering lory
- Lilac-crowned amazon
- Red-browed fig parrot
- Crimson-winged parrot
- Eclectus parrot
- Golden-shouldered parrot
- Scarlet-chested parrot
- Red-collared lorikeet
- Varied lorikeet
- Blue-winged parrot
- Thick-billed parrot
- African grey parrot
- Plum-headed parrot
- Rock parrot
- Nanday parakeet
- Jandaya parakeet
- Sun conure
- Cuban conure
- Red-tailed black cockatoo
- Derbyan parakeet
- Moustached parakeet
- Gang-gang cockatoo
- Major Mitchell's cockatoo aka pink cockatoo
- Glossy black cockatoo

===== Soft-billed birds =====
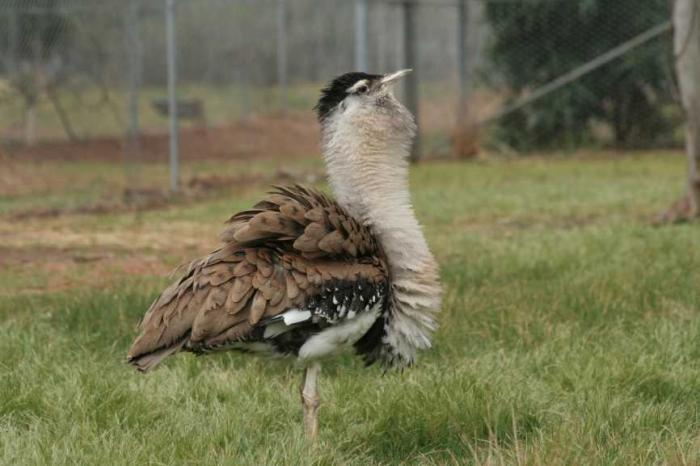
An Australian bustard

Species names are as published in the guidebook:

- Australian bustard
- Red-backed kingfisher
- Tawny frogmouth
- Male spotted bowerbird
- Buff-banded rail
- Green catbird

===== Finches, pigeons and doves =====
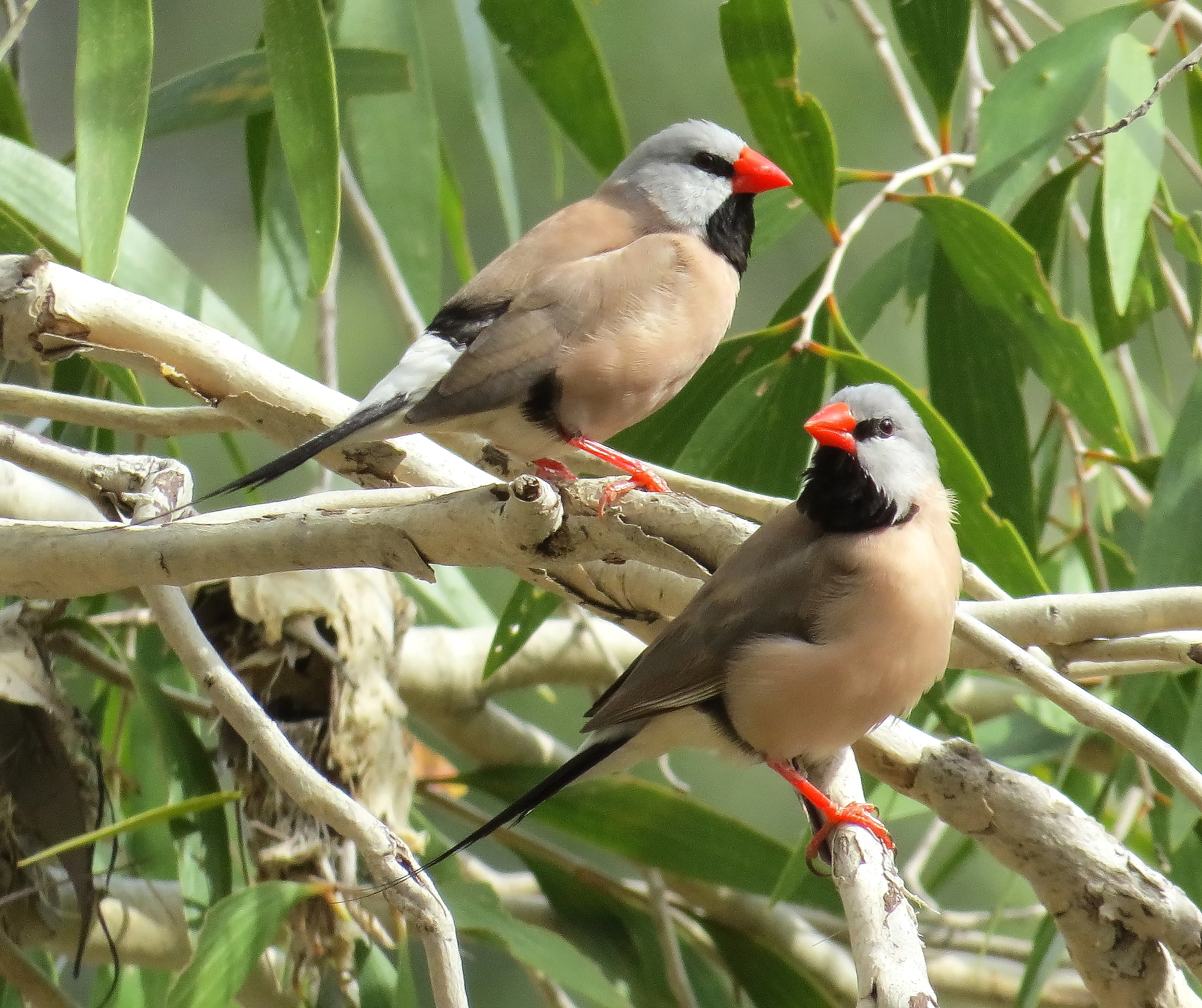
A pair of long-tailed grass finches

Species names are as published in the guidebook:

- Blue-faced parrot finch
- Cuban finch aka the Cuban melodious finch
- Long-tailed grass finch
- Star finch
- Bleeding heart pigeon
- Spinifex pigeon
- Torres Strait pigeon
- White-fronted ground dove

===== Water birds =====
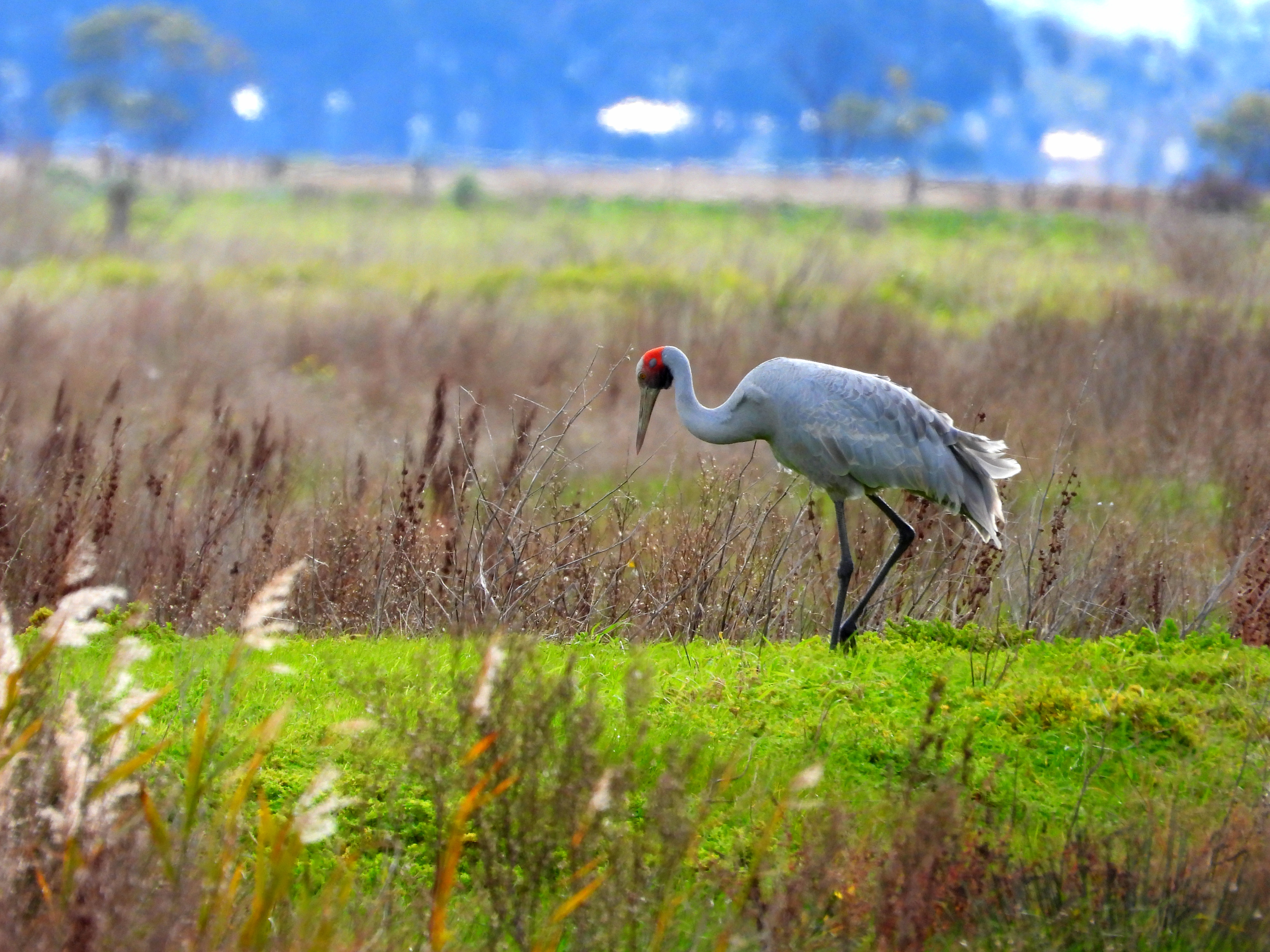
A brolga in the wild. "The brolga, as with other crane species, is noted for its unique courtship dance"

Species names are as published in the guidebook:

- Australian pelican
- Brolga
- Mute swans
- Mandarin duck
- Burdekin duck

===== Ratites =====
Species names are as published in the guidebook:

- Ostrich
- Cassowary
- Emu
- Rhea

==== Indigenous flora ====
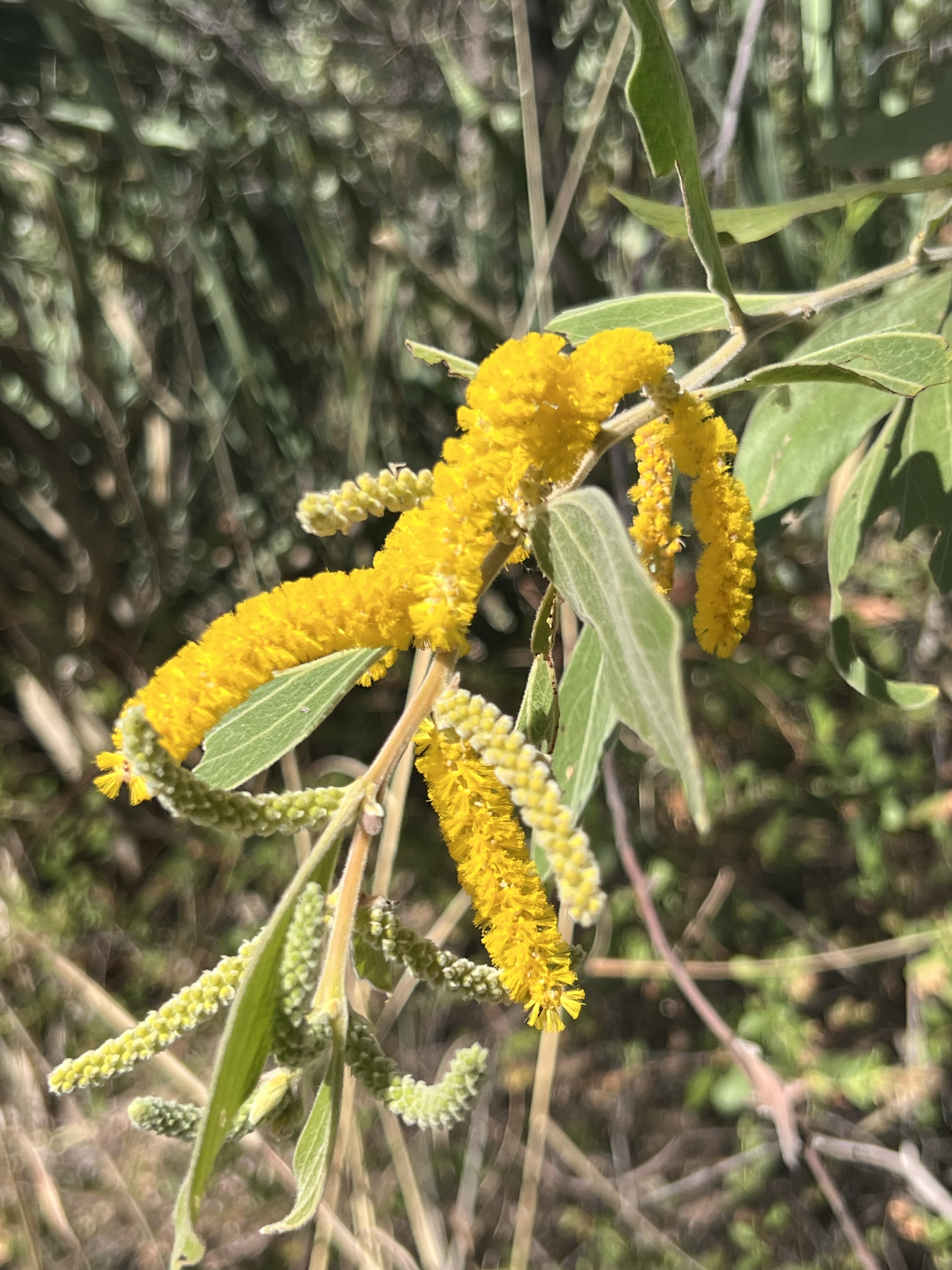
Candelabra wattle, photographed in Emma Gorge, El Questro Wilderness Park, Western Australia

In addition to the many mammals and birds onsite, the guidebook also listed the varied indigenous plant and tree species which were growing onsite. The guidebook noted that 15,000 trees had been planted as of 1988. Note: species names are as published in the guidebook:

- Magabala (Marsdenia viridflora)
- Guwal (Flueggea virosa)
- Gabiny (Terminalia ferdinandiana)
- Wild pear (Persoonia falcata)
- Northern sandalwood (Santalum lanceolatum)
- Nawulu (Terminalia petiolaris)
- Candelabra wattle (Acacia holosericea)
- Yugulu (Cassytha filiformis)
- Long-fruited bloodwood (Eucalyptus polycarpa)
- Northern kurrajong (Eucalyptus terminalis)
- Sandpaper fig (Ficus opposita)
- Boab (Adersonia gregorii)
- Weeping Mitchell grass (Astrebla elymoides)
- Kimberley couch (Brachyachne convergens)
- Mossman River grass (Cenchrus echinatus)
- Kimberley horse poison (Crotalaria crispata)
- Sensitive plant (Neptunia dimorphantha)
- Wild passionfruit (Passiflora foetida)
- Camel bush (Trichodesma zeylanicum)
- Prickly mimosa (Acacia farnesiana)
- Chinese lantern (Dichrostachys spicata)
- Peachwood (Ehretia saligna)
- Native fuchsia (Eremophila maculata)
- Wild cotton (Gossypium australe)
- Prickly grevillea (Grevillea angulata)
- Silver leaf grevillea (Grevillea refracta)
- Broome pindan wattle (Acacia eriopoda)
- Ironwood (Erythropleum chlorostachys)
- Broome bloodwood (Eucalyptus zygophylla)
- Helicopter tree (Gyrocarpus americanus)
- Common hakea (Hakea arborescens)
- Bauhinia (Lysiphyllum cunninghamii)

=== Breeding successes ===
The zoo stated that it was "committed to an acquisition and breeding programme in conjunction with other zoos and wildlife parks (which) creates a mutual improvement of the genetic viability of their respective collections." In this way the diminishing stocks of the rare species could be re-established. The zoo confirmed that "several" of the animals in its possession were there on breeding loan, and detailed some of its breeding successes:

- Scimitar-horned oryx:Three baby oryx had been born at the zoo, with the African animal noticeably "thriving in the Broome environment"
- Gemsbok: "At present, the Pearl Coast Zoo is the only zoo in Australia with these rare and beautiful mammals. The group at the Zoo are young adults, approaching breeding age".
- Blackbuck antelope: The species was noted to breed well in captivity, and 10 fawns had already been born at the zoo.
- Hog deer: In 1988, the doe (female) hog deer gave birth to one female calf.
- Javan rusa deer: A "number" of baby Javan rusa deer had been born at the zoo.
- Ground cuscus: In 1987, a baby cuscus was born at the zoo.
- Great palm cockatoo: "The most significant event in the Pearl Coast Zoo's ambitious breeding programme was the birth of a baby Palm Cockatoo in 1987." The fertile egg of the parrots had to be removed from the nest and hatched in the incubator room of the Breeding Complex due to the parent's tendency to break their eggs in captivity.
- Red-browed fig parrot: The successful breeding of the red-browed fig parrot at the zoo was noted to have produced "valuable information" which would be applied to saving the "very rare" Coxen's fig parrot, then at risk of extinction. As of 2025, it was still highly endangered.

=== Latter years (post-1988) ===
Russell Chapman, Attorney for McAlpine, would reveal in late 1992 when the zoo had almost closed that "during the past four years", it had "operated under extremely adverse conditions", owing first to the 1989 Australian pilots' dispute and afterwards the early 1990s recession.

In early 1989, McAlpine purchased two lots of land for a total of $110,000. In late 1991, he bought a further lot for $620,000 after a revaluation of the area increased the price. By this stage, the zoo had more than doubled in size from its original acreage, as the State Register of Heritage Places noted:

"The zoo featured natural enclosures covered approximately 60 hectares (sic - acres?) and a large wetland was the centre piece of the grounds. Movement around the grounds was largely on walkways approximately 2 meters above the ground enabling visitors to view into the enclosures. The focus of the collection was African species, particularly antelope as the climate was similar to the African environment but without endemic diseases. Native parrots were also a speciality of the collection with three large aviaries for a diverse and wide ranging collection of rare birds. The museum had a successful breeding program in several species. Despite some initial opposition from locals and some environmentalists the zoo was initially a success. However, a number of factors, including economic recession and the pilot strike in 1989, lead to the demise of McAlpine's Broome assets and the zoo closed c1991."

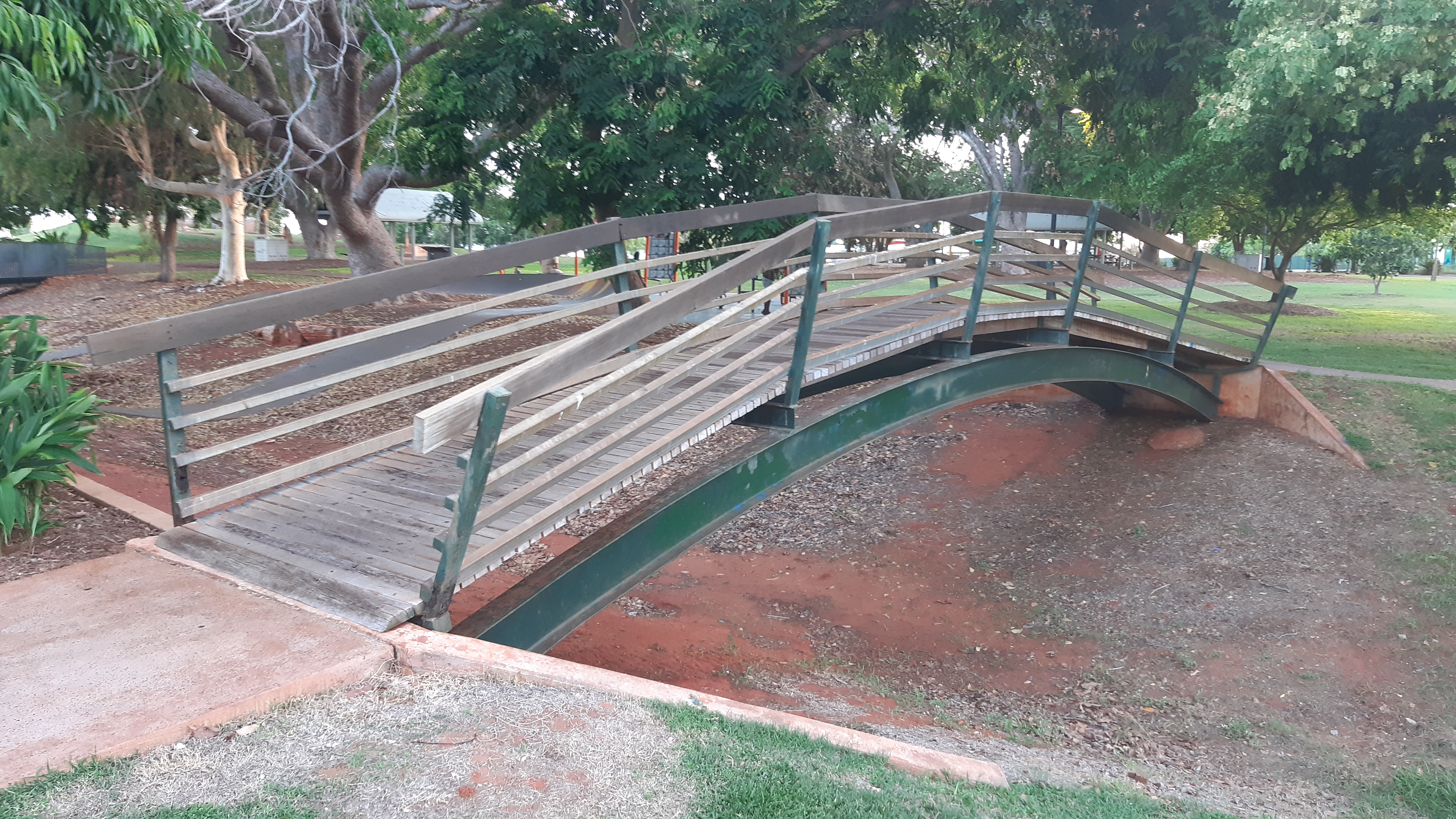
A metal and timber bridge at Town Beach park in Broome centre, rumoured to have been salvaged from the zoo

The "kilometre long elevated walkway" was noted as a feature of the Pearl Coast Zoo in the guidebook of 1988, noting: "This gives visitors an excellent, unobstructed view of the animals in their bush surroundings. The timber walkway also provides another form of shade for the animals during the heat of the day".

According to former staff, Lord McAlpine would frequently visit the zoo himself, "doling out jobs as he strolled around the thatched roof enclosures to check on the animals". In a November 1990 article in New Idea magazine, it was revealed that 48-year-old McAlpine had recently dropped into Broome unannounced and in disguise "to look over his zoo... wearing scruffy jeans, shirt and old felt hat"... looking "anything but one of the richest men in Europe". The magazine noted that travelling and living incognito had become somewhat of an "irritating fact of life for Lord McAlpine" who had recently been placed on an IRA hitlist. "A survivor of the Brighton hotel bombing in 1984, he is a prime IRA target", the magazine recounted. McAlpine's West Green House in Hampshire had also recently been bombed by the group in June 1990, a building in which he had been living just a few weeks prior, and where the Prime Minister Margaret Thatcher had previously been a guest. Delivering a press meeting at his "$50 million Cable Beach Club", Lord McAlpine quipped "I often remind the staff that if they see a rather scruffy person in jeans wandering about the place not to throw him out. It could be me!"

The June 1990 article also confirmed that Diana and Congo, pygmy hippopotami borrowed from Melbourne Zoo on a breeding loan had produced a male baby, which zoo keeper Sheila McCoey was pictured holding. Other breeding happenings were relayed to locals via a public notice board: "Every day a 'match and hatch' despatch is posted on a noticeboard outside reception, giving details of breeding successes at the zoo."

The October 1990 edition of Broome News included an article reprinted from The Sydney Morning Herald (entitled 'The Lord of Broome Puts Up 'For Sale' Signs And Heads For Venice') in which it was reported that McAlpine was in the process of selling numerous of his Australian assets, including 50% of his Cable Beach Resort in Broome. John Adams, the chairman of the McAlpine family-owned, Perth-based company, Australian City Properties (ACP) noted that two other projects of theirs in the Broome region were now "on hold", including the previously proposed Walcott Inlet tourist development, and Kununurra tourist development. By February 1991, it was clear that Australian City Properties were pulling out of Broome, and selling many of their assets there, however Broome News noted that "At the time of writing, the Pearl Coast Zoo and McAlpine's private residence in Louis Street were not for sale."

In March 1991, the Broome Bulletin announced that the first primates to be exhibited at the zoo had arrived; "the start of what will become an extensive Primate Department". The delivery included family groups of the Pygmy marmoset (the world's smallest primate) and the Red-Handed Tamarin. Chief Mammal Keeper, Graham Goldsmith, clarified that "because of the recent refuelers' strikes and bundles of paperwork, the primates arrival was slightly delayed."

In May 1991, The New York Times visited the zoo, and reported that a white rhino was "on the way" as a new addition. The article made no mention of any financial difficulties the zoo may have been suffering under.

=== Plans for a walk-through aviary ===
In the 1988 guidebook, the idea to build a large "walk-though rainforest aviary" was mentioned as a possible plan for the future. Very little additional information was given about the planned project, other than it was envisaged to stand over 20 metres high and would contain a large waterfall and flowing creek.

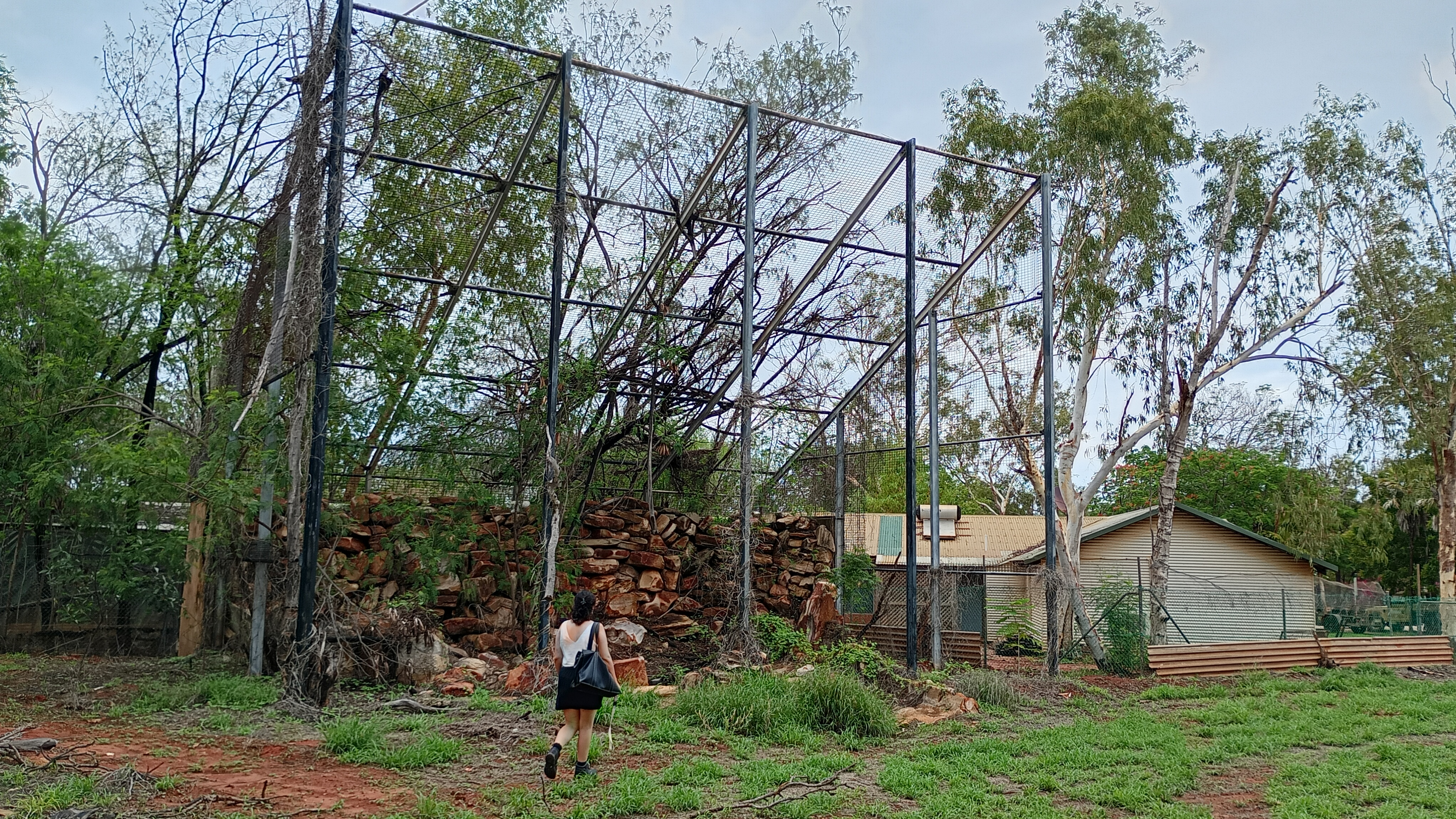
Remains of the palm cockatoo cage, December 2024

In February 1992, McAlpine again announced plans to construct a walk-though aviary onsite, in order "to house the ever increasing numbers of birds and to allow for diversification in species". The planned aviary "would be larger than the one in Singapore" (Jurong Bird Park) and might well be the biggest in the Southern Hemisphere". The planned aviary was to measure 240 metres long x 96 metres wide x 7 metres high, and would be built over 2.3 hectares, housing species from Northern Australia. As reported in the North West Telegraph: Kimberley Edition at the time:

"The public will be able to walk through and view at close quarters birds that it would take many days to see while walking through the Kimberley bush". He (McAlpine) said the zoo has had many successes in breeding rare and endangered species of birds and has been credited with two first breedings in captivity. "Two years ago we were given a Collecting Permit from CALM to collect 12 White-quilled rock pigeons," he said. "We have since been very successful in breeding this species and many of the birds will be made available to other zoos."

Zoo director Graham Taylor added that the aviary would not be as high as existing ones onsite already, but would be built to blend into the bush. "There will be feeding stations at several points inside the aviary and native bird species in the area will be encouraged to come and go freely". Taylor added that the zoo already had most of the materials on hand that would be needed to construct the aviary, and the only costs that would be incurred would be for engineering advice and labour for construction.

=== Relocation of larger animals ===
As early as September 1991, it was noted in the Sunday Territorian newspaper that Australian businessman Warren Anderson had bought 170 "exotic animals" from the zoo for $1.5 million.

An article in The West Australian dated 11 September 1992, noted that two tapirs, four pygmy hippos and two cus-cus had been recently moved from Broome Zoo to Tipperary Zoo (Tipperary Station in the Northern Territory) in a "specially modified air-conditioned truck", marking the final step in a transport operation which had seen 135 animals moved out of Broome Zoo in the past year. Pearl Coast Zoo manager Graeme Taylor (sic) clarified that all animals had survived the journey, and blamed the cost of hay on forcing the zoo to sell the animals. The West Australian noted that "although in a similar climactic belt to Broome, Tipperary has a higher rainfall and the station has the capacity to grow much of its own feed. Allowed to browse in big open range paddocks irrigated from the Daly River, the animals have been thriving..."

In December 1992, McAlpine's attorney Russell Chapman explained how "a several months' long operation" had been carried out earlier that year when all of the larger animals from the zoo had been transported to Warren Anderson's large Tipperary Station. This action had come about "as the result of escalating costs of keeping the animals, especially in the face of dwindling tourists numbers to the town (of Broome)." Anderson was assembling a personal collection of exotic Asian and African animals, and his purchase put him in possession of "the largest privately owned mammal collection outside of Australia's major cities".

Some of the animals later escaped from Tipperary.

== Financial difficulties ==
On 20 February 1992, The West Australian published an article entitled 'Broome Zoo Land Switch' in which McAlpine's plans to develop prime crown land (which he had been given to "extend his defunct Broome zoo" by the Dowding government) was looked at.

On 22 February 1992, The West Australian noted from McAlpine's hotel suite in Sydney that he had dismissed suggestions that he was planning to make a fortune by selling crown land granted to him by the State Government for his Broome zoo. McAlpine, "who closed parts of his Pearl Coast Zoo last year", said that he needed the development to keep afloat the zoo project which was losing $1.5 million annually:

Lord McAlpine said the Broome myth that there was a clever attempt to get the land from the Government to be able to one day flog it for zillions was wrong. There was no way he would have spent millions developing the zoo if he just planned to off-load the land.

On 27 February 1992, Planning Minister David Smith inspected what was at that point referred to as "the Old Pearl Coast Zoo" which the Broome Shire Council was at that point considering rezoning. Smith assured reporters that he was just "familiarising himself with the area", and that the rezoning matter was "in the hands of the local community and the council."

Smith explained that McAlpine had paid "a total of AUD $730,000 for freehold leases on 51.6 hectares" on which to build his zoo, and that "the owner (was) now simply exercising his normal rights as a citizen to apply to council and the Department of Planning and Urban Development to be allowed to use the land for an alternate purpose". The rezoning application was, by 27 February 1992, noted to have been with the DPUD who were "likely to seek approval to advertise", after which the Broome community would be consulted.

In March 1992, Taylor acknowledged that the zoo was struggling financially, and identified a number of factors that were contributing to this, including the ongoing recession as well as cheap airfares to the eastern states of Australia which were drawing potential visitors there instead. There had been at least a 15% drop in tourism to the zoo in 1992 compared to 1991, and Taylor advised that this had been a "major factor" in the decision to relocate the larger animals, which had been "a sad move but an economic necessity";

"...This in turn has meant that we now employ only nine people as compared with 39 last year. The government really needs to inject some funding into a major advertising campaign tourism promotion of the area, and Ansett needs to help out with better airfare deals to the north". Mr Taylor said although the zoo was never intended to make money, neither could it afford to continue making a loss. And since Lord McAlpine did not want to close it down, some sort of action needed to be taken.

Zoo director Graham Taylor confirmed that regardless of other proposed developments on the site of the zoo, the integrity of the zoological gardens would remain intact. "Our brief is to increase the numbers of birds, reptiles and primates at the park," he said. "The bird collection already numbers 1,400 which is larger than any other bird display in zoos throughout Australia. By the end of 1994, we hope to have increased bird numbers to around 2,500".

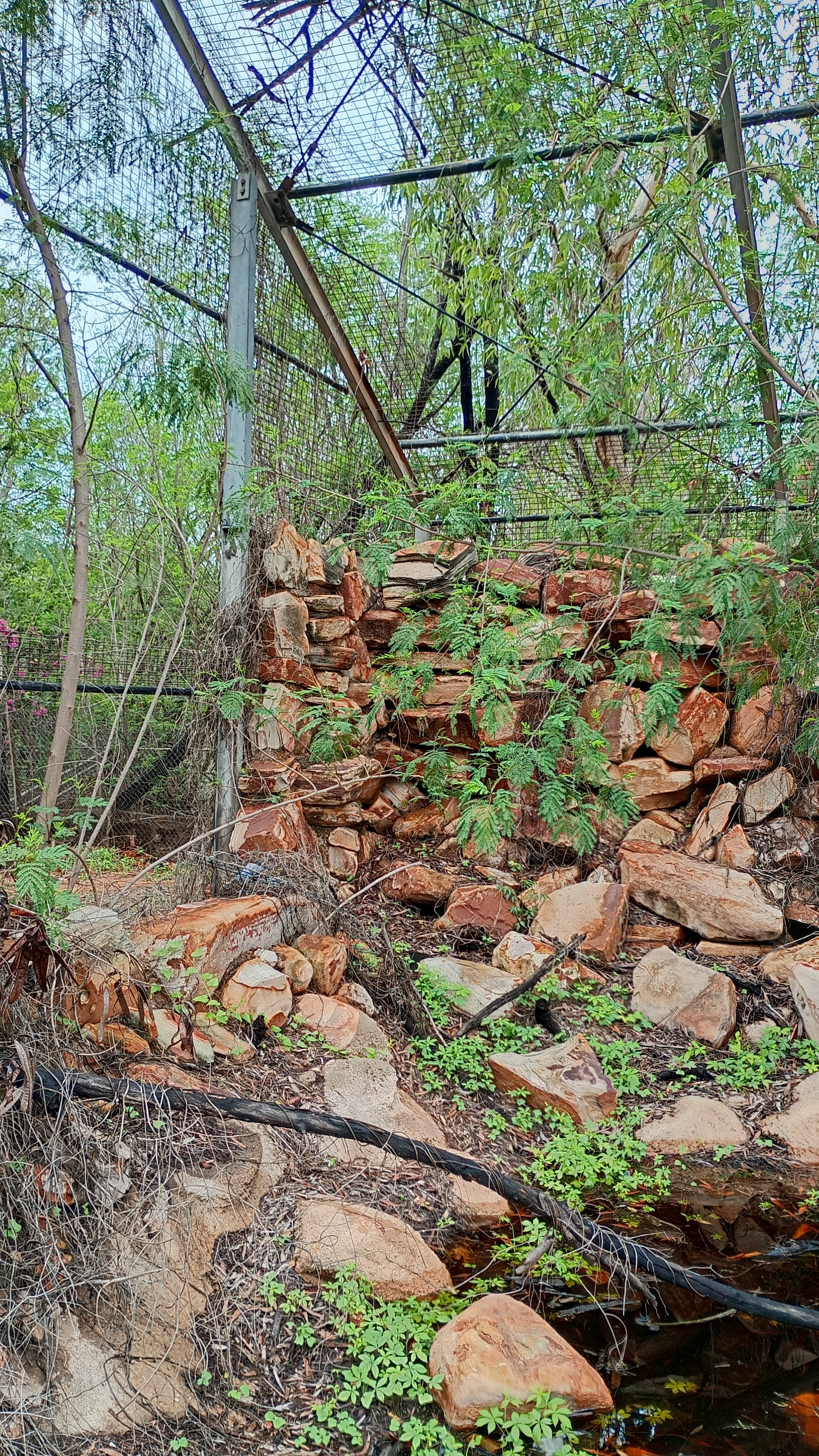
The ruins of the palm cockatoo cage, and interior pond, in 2024

In September 1992, Taylor discussed the recent relocation of the larger animals at the zoo to Warren Anderson's Tipperary Station in the Northern Territory, clarifying that "the departure of the last of the animals from Broome would allow the zoo to concentrate on its extensive bird collection and to develop colonies of tree-dwelling monkeys."

In November 1992, the Kimberley Echo noted that six Red-browed fig parrots had hatched at the zoo in the previous week, marking a "breakthrough in the breeding of captive birds in Australia". Zoo manager Graham Taylor was quoted as saying that "they (were) expecting one of the best seasons ever in Broome as they continue(d) to fine tune their breeding techniques", and that "last year, 625 fledglings from 200 different species were bred as part of (the zoos) involvement with the Currumbin Sanctuary captive breeding management programme." Taylor noted that red-browed fig parrots could no longer be taken from the wild, and that captive breeding for this species was vital. The knowledge gained from the rearing of the chicks was also noted as being useful for a proposed breeding programme of the closely-related Blue-browed fig parrot, which was at that point regarded as endangered.

The Broome Advertiser of 3 December 1992 noted the zoo had closed its gatehouse, and that "total closure of the park (was) inevitable":

Lord McAlpine's Wonderful World of Birds, better known as the Pearl Coast Zoological Gardens, in Broome, has closed its gatehouse. While the public will, for a time, continue to have access to the gardens through the office; and while it will remain open for tours and the visitors from Singapore who will be in Broome later this month, it appears that total closure of the park is inevitable. The news has come as a blow to staff, who learned of the decision just late last week. Several have been given notice."

Attorney for McAlpine, Russell Chapman, explained that "years of running at a loss" had finally taken its toll on the business, as well as the recession. Chapman explained that the zoo had been running at a loss ever since it opened, and while management had tried through various means to make it viable, they couldn't do so any longer. Visitor numbers had dropped "by around 60% during the past two years", Chapman explained, adding:

"Although our bird breeding program has been going extremely well, with a very high success rate, the market for birds, as with everything else, has deteriorated markedly [..] The prices that the birds have been fetching, both at home and overseas, are a fraction of what they used to be. Added to this, the freight costs from Broome to where the markets are (mostly on the East Coast) are high. We will, therefore, be more than likely moving our breeding program to East Coast centres. While Lord McAlpine is very sad about this, it is just a reality of life.

When asked by the Broome Advertiser what possible future developments could be planned for the zoo land, Chapman replied that no decisions had yet been made.

=== Closure of zoo ===
The 1989 Australian pilots' dispute, which lasted six months (and severely disrupted domestic travel and tourism within Australia), was largely blamed as being a contributing factor in the zoo's demise.

UK-based newspaper The Telegraph noted that McAlpine's Australian tourism venture as a whole, in which he had invested £250 million, collapsed as a result, costing him much of his personal fortune. He was also forced to sell his Cable Beach Club Resort in the mid-1990s, which co-owners the Western Australian Development Corporation (WADC) had already pulled out of by February 1991, and by February 1992 was noted as losing $1.5 million per year. A mid-1990s source notes that McAlpine sold the Cable Beach Club Resort in 1995 to American property developer G. Ware Travelstead.

"I was not privy to the finances, but I feel that 100,000 people at $10 a head would have made it viable today (..) It would have been a fantastic thing here now"

— Vet Dave Morrell lamenting the loss of the zoo in the 2002 book And Why Broome?

Writing of the zoo after its closure, the journalist Hugh Edwards summarised the episode thus:

While the zoo apparently thrived and was a great success in itself, there were not enough people visiting Broome to pay the entry fee needed to pay for its upkeep and there could only be one end to that (..) Sadly Lord McAlpine found that he had achieved the seemingly impossible. He had over-reached his finances. His beloved zoo had seduced him to spend money which even he could not afford.

Reminiscing in 2000 about the zoo, Lyn Page, former employee of McAlpine's, former-Sun Pictures manager and Broome Shire Council member, remarked:

Alistair had bought the land and built the zoo for endangered species in the early 80s. It cost him $1,250,000 each year to run and it ran at an enormous loss. He was so passionate about the zoo. He and his staff tried desperately to find sponsorship for it but to no avail. When the zoo closed it impacted on all of us. It had been a huge asset to both the local community and to our growing tourism industry. I can't help wondering if it wasn't just a little ahead of its time. Regardless, it was a magical place.

== Legacy ==
An estimated AUD $500 million was spent by McAlpine on his Broome enterprises, including the purchasing of thousands of trees and plants in an attempt to "turn the harsh town into the tropical paradise he'd envisaged".

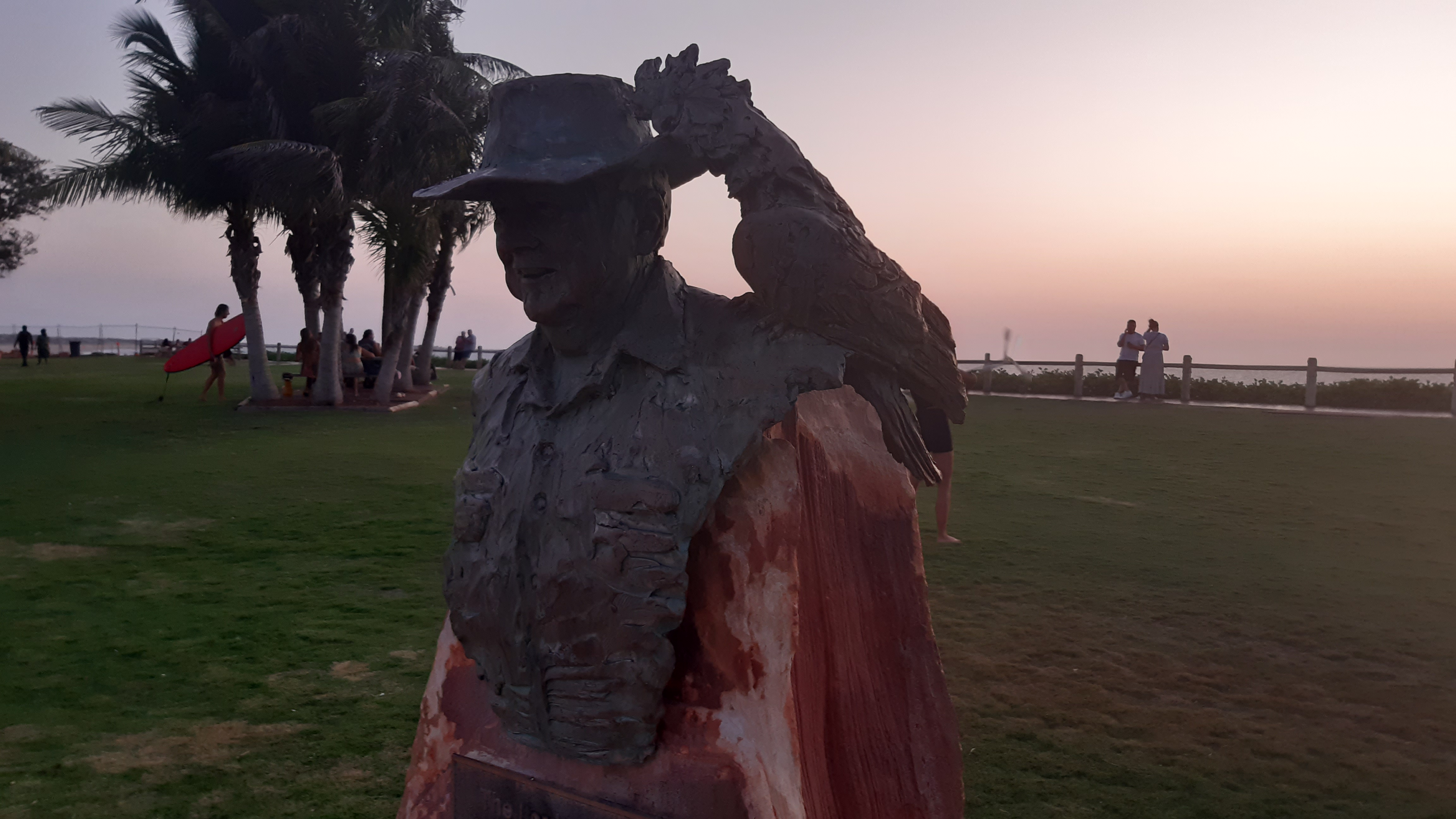
Sculpture of McAlpine with cockatoo on his shoulder at Cable Beach

McAlpine's last visit to Broome occurred in 2012 on which occasion a bronze sculpture by artist Linda Klarfeld was unveiled in his honour at Cable Beach headland. The sculpture depicts McAlpine in a 'bush hat' with a cockatoo on his shoulder.

Baron McAlpine died in January 2014, having lost much of his inherited fortune. Following his death, ABC News noted that through his actions, he had been credited with "reinvigorating the once-sleepy [..] pearling town of Broome".

Lullfitz Drive, the original name of the street on which the zoo was located, was renamed Sanctuary Road in the year 2000 in recognition of McAlpine's plan that the zoo would serve as a sanctuary for endangered species. Lullfitz Drive (named after botanist and horticulturist Fred Lullfitz who lived nearby) still remains in Broome, but is not as long as before.

=== Subsequent distribution of land ===
The North West Telegraph: Kimberley Edition of 25 March 1992 reported that the Shire of Broome had recently approved an amendment providing for the rezoning of land near the Pearl Coast Zoological Gardens. Lord McAlpine had applied to have the wildlife park site rezoned to 'Special Site - Residential, Holiday Accommodation, Staff Housing, Tourist Development and Ancillary Uses'. The Broome Advertiser of 3 December 1992 later noted that the land had been successfully rezoned as such, but had been "the subject of controversy".

Of the three lots in question being rezoned, the first two had been purchased in early 1989 for a total of $110,000. The third lot, according to the North West Telegraph, had been purchased after the area had been amended and after a revaluation of the area, costing Lord McAlpine $620,000 in late 1991.

In the same article, a spokesperson for the Department of Land Administration said departmental officers had been "concerned at the speed with which land was being taken up by Lord McAlpine", and had "counselled caution and a need to look at the overall planning" for what they described as prime beach-front land. The department also expressed concerns that "although the first lot was leased subject to public competition, the same was not true of subsequent lots which were offered to him as extensions of the existing Wildlife Park in mid-1987".

On a trip to Broome in 1993, return-visitor Sandy Trevor and husband Noel decided on a whim to buy a property in the town, and described the process at the time thus:

...we went off to the real estate agents the next morning. That was when we met Griff. He was terrific and drove us around Broome for a couple of hours showing us the different areas and what was available, etc. It was then we learnt that the land where the Pearl Coast Zoo had been, was to be subdivided into residential lots. We had been so lucky in 1991 to have visited that unique zoo. It was truly a tragedy that Lord McAlpine's brainchild had to close due to a combination of the airline pilots' strike in the late 1980s and the collapse of W.A. Inc, the 50% government partner in the Club with McAlpine. We decided then and there to take out an option and put down a deposit on Sunset Park at Cable Beach. We were the first people to do so on Stage One of the subdivision. I put it down to Karma, this was meant to be.

Authors Anne Coombs and Susan Varga, writing in 2001, noted that "When the zoo closed, the land was subdivided. It is now covered with expensive homes and holiday apartments, way beyond the reach of the local people."

== Remains of the zoo ==
Parts of the zoo were demolished in 1991, and the majority of the property was "sold and subsequently subdivided for residential development". The grounds of the former zoo are therefore no longer visible, however "some of the buildings [..] originally used for the zoo have been retained and [..] repurposed for other commercial functions including the Willie Creek Pearls showroom", according to the State Register of Heritage Places. As of 2024, the frame and mesh of a corner of the old palm cockatoo cage was still standing on a section of vacant land off Koolama Drive.

=== Willie Creek Pearls showroom ===
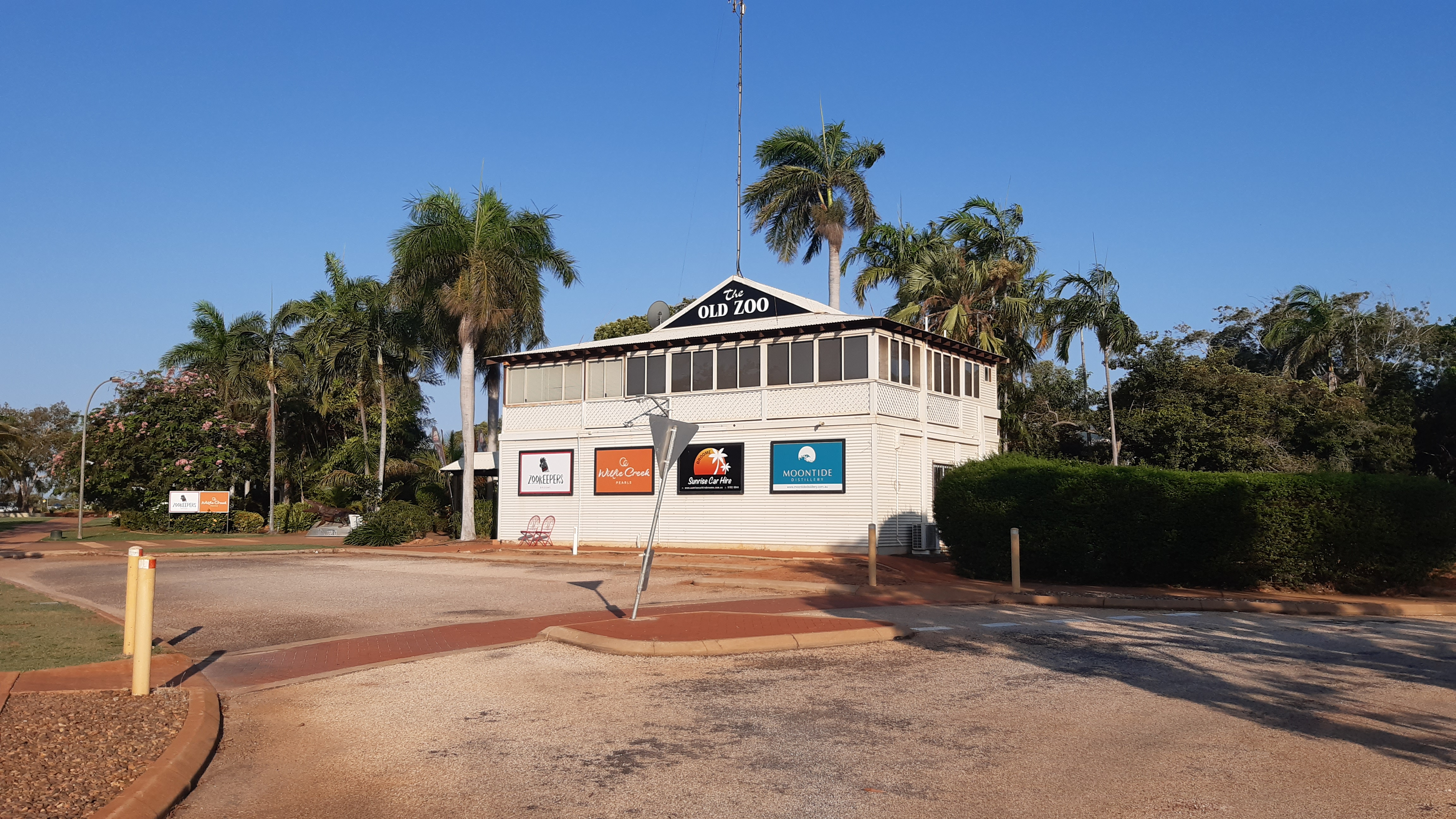
The former Administration Office of the zoo, October 2024

In 1994, the Banfield family purchased the former Pearl Coast Zoo buildings on Challenor Drive (opposite the Cable Beach Club Resort), and converted them into an administrative headquarters for their Willie Creek Pearl Farm business interests. The following year, 1995, the Banfield family opened their Cable Beach showroom at the Old Zoo site they had acquired the year before.

=== The Old Zoo Cafe ===
On 15 October 1997, the Broome Advertiser reported that the past three months had seen the entrance and administration buildings of the old Broome zoo "transformed and renovated" by Robert Banfield and Don Bacon, and that they would "soon be home to a new cafe". The Advertiser explained how the Banfield's planned to feature zoo memorabilia on the walls of the cafe, such as photographs, posters, artifacts and signs, with a request also being sent out for "anyone who may have any memorabilia from the old zoo, who would like to donate it to add to the character of the place" to do so.

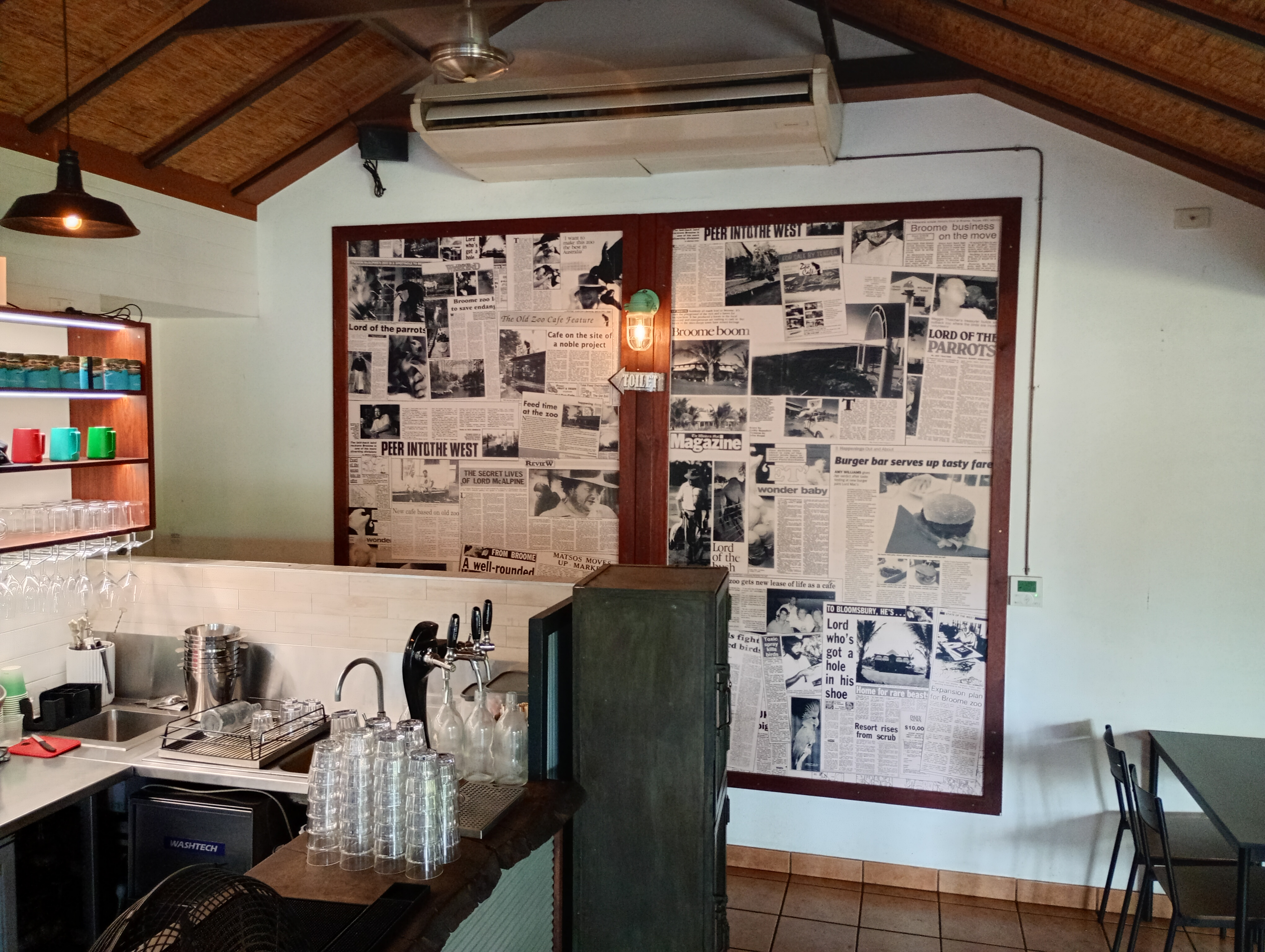
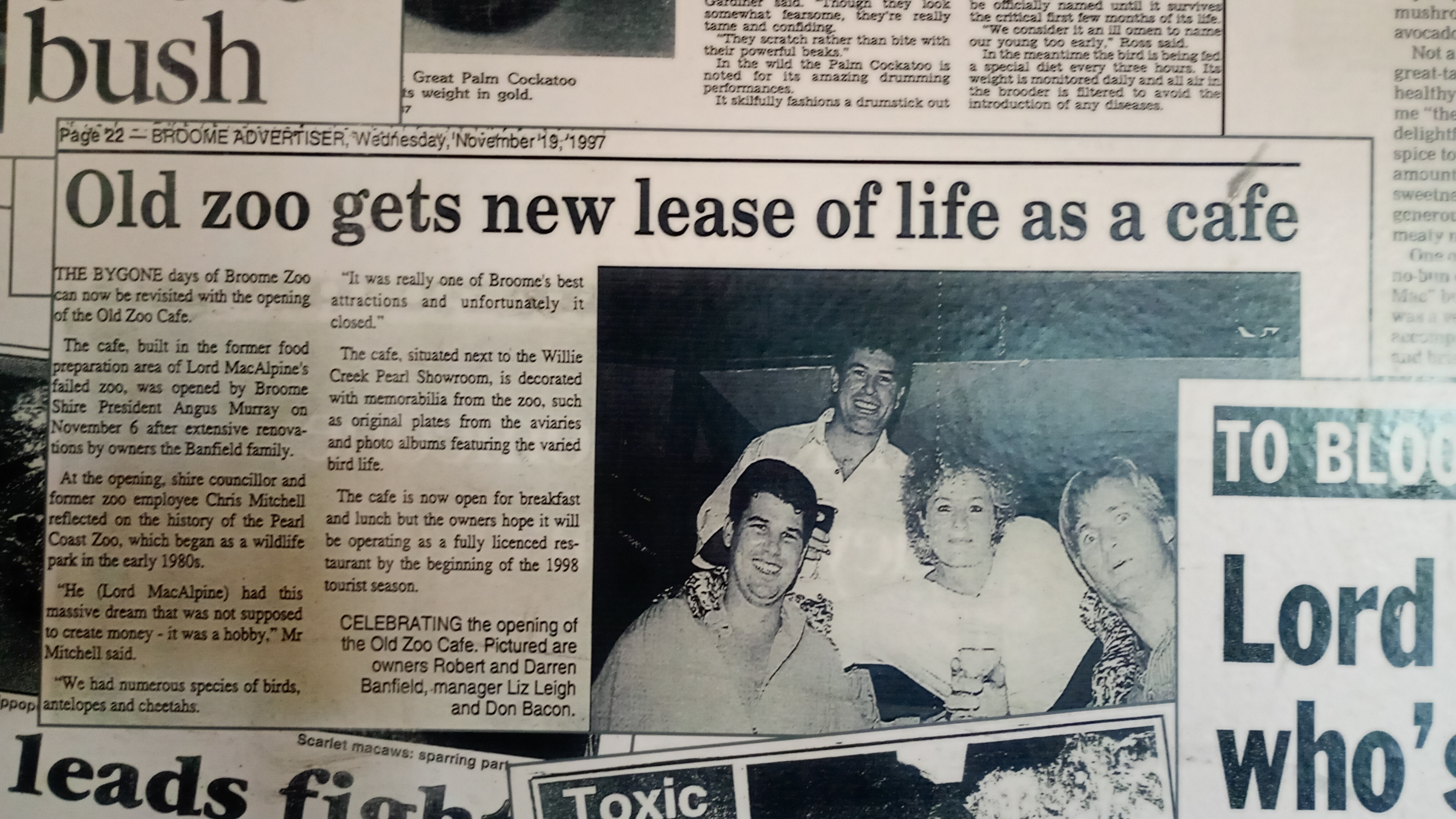
A collage of zoo-related news clippings on the wall of Zookeepers Broome café in December 2024 (Note: café was originally opened in November 1997 as the Old Zoo Café)

Robert Banfield explained how the old zoo buildings had become dilapidated and falling down, and so the decision had been made to turn it into a cafe. "The only original parts of the building are the slab and the roof and we have restored some of the windows", he said, adding "The actual food preparation area of the old zoo will be the food prep area of the cafe... We have tried to keep a bit of the history of the area by creating the Old Zoo Cafe".

=== Eco Beach Resort ===
As of the year 2000, the wooden walkways that connected the chalets at Eco Beach Wilderness Resort (two hours south of Broome) were ones which had been salvaged from Pearl Coast Zoo according to Lyn Page, wife of the owner of the resort, Karl Plunkett, at the time.

== Conservation of zoo remains ==
The site has been noted by the State Register of Heritage Places for holding historic value for "its association with the rapid development of the tourist industry in Broome during the 1980s", and social value for "the members of the Broome and wider community who visited, worked there, or were aware of its presence in the outskirts of the town".

On 27 June 2019, the site of the former zoo was given the status 'Adopted' by the Municipal Inventory of the Shire of Broome, with a 'Grading C' category, and the following appraisal: "A place (including a site with no built remains) of some cultural heritage significance to (the) Shire of Broome. No constraints. Recommend: Encourage retention of the place, or where there are ruins, archaeological findings or no built remains: Interpret the place."

On 21 January 2020, the site was allocated as 'Place number: 26354' by the State Register of Heritage Places.

== See also ==
- Broome Bird Observatory, an educational, scientific and recreational facility established in 1988

== Sources ==
- Bonser, Phil (1988). Pearl Coast Zoo - Broome, Western Australia. Broome: Phil Bonser Research and Presentation Pty Ltd. ISBN 0-7316-2605-2.
- Coombs, Anne; Varga, Susan (2001). Broometime. Sydney: Hodder Headline Australia. ISBN 0-7336-1449-3.
- Edwards, Hugh (2008). A New Broome: Broome's 125th Anniversary. Swanbourne: Hugh Edwards. ISBN 978-0-646-50550-3.
- McAlpine, Alistair (1999). Bagman To Swagman - Tales of Broome, the North-West and other Australian Adventures. Sydney: Allen & Unwin. ISBN 1-86508-104-3.
- McAlpine, Alistair (2002). Adventures Of A Collector. Sydney: Allen & Unwin. ISBN 1-86508-786-6.
- Rigby, Peter (1995). Broome (Nomad series). Fremantle: Plantagenet Press Pty Ltd. ISBN 1-875-968-08-3.
- Shaw, Carol (2001). The History of Broome's Street Names. Broome: Pindan Printing. ISBN 0-646-40660-4.
- Trevor, Noel (2000). Why Broome?. Cable Beach, Broome: Noel Trevor & Associates Pty. Ltd. ISBN 0-646-38649-2.
- Trevor, Noel (2002a). And Why Broome?. Cable Beach, Broome: Noel Trevor Enterprises. ISBN 9780957961012.
- Trevor, Noel (2002b). Why Not Broome?. Cable Beach, Broome: Noel Trevor Enterprises. ISBN 0957961006.
