= Valuer general =

A valuer general or valuer-general (plural: valuers general, valuers-general) is the chief government official in charge of the land valuation system in their jurisdiction.

== Australia ==
- Valuer General of New South Wales
- Valuer-General of Norfolk Island
- Valuer General of Queensland
- Valuer General of Victoria
- Valuer-General of South Australia
- Valuer-General of Tasmania
- Valuer-General of Western Australia
- Valuer-General of the Northern Territory

== Namibia ==
- Valuer-General of Namibia

== New Zealand ==
- Valuer-General of New Zealand

== Papua New Guinea ==
- Valuer General of Papua New Guinea

== South Africa ==
- Office of the Valuer-General South Africa

== Vanuatu ==
- Valuer General of Vanuatu
