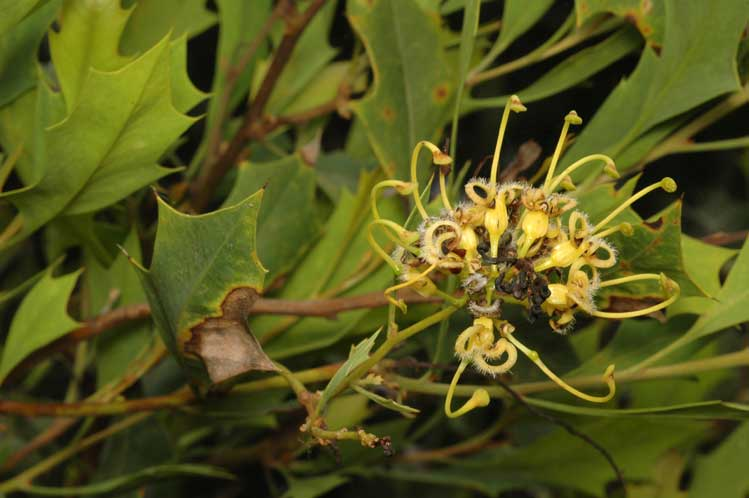
- In the Hunter Region Botanic Gardens

Conservation status
- Least Concern (IUCN 3.1)

Scientific classification
- Kingdom: Plantae
- Clade: Embryophytes
- Clade: Tracheophytes
- Clade: Spermatophytes
- Clade: Angiosperms
- Clade: Eudicots
- Order: Proteales
- Family: Proteaceae
- Genus: Grevillea
- Species: G. angulata

Binomial name
- Grevillea angulata R.Br.

= Grevillea angulata =

Species of shrub endemic to Western Australia

Grevillea angulata is a species of flowering plant in the family Proteaceae and is endemic to the Top End of the Northern Territory. It is a spreading to erect shrub with pinnatifid or toothed leaves and cream-coloured flowers.

== Description ==
Grevillea angulata is a spreading to erect shrub that typically grows to a height of 1–2.5 m (3 ft 3 in – 8 ft 2 in), its foliage covered with fine hairs pressed against the surface. The leaves are oblong to elliptic in outline, 55–110 mm (2.2–4.3 in) long and 24–40 mm (0.94–1.57 in) wide and pinnatifid or with seven to twenty-nine pointed lobes. The flowers are arranged in leaf axils or on the ends of branches on a rachis 15–30 mm (0.59–1.18 in) long. The flowers are green in the bud stage but open cream-coloured and covered with white hairs, the pistil 18–24 mm (0.71–0.94 in) long with a white to cream-coloured, green-tipped style. Flowering mainly occurs from March to September and the fruit is a glabrous follicle 10–14 mm (0.39–0.55 in) long.

== Taxonomy ==
Grevillea angulata was first formally described in 1830 by Robert Brown in his Supplementum primum prodromi florae Novae Hollandiae. The specific epithet (angulata) means "angular" or "angled".

== Distribution and habitat ==
This grevillea grows in shrubland and woodland near creeks or in rocky places, sometimes near the coast, and is found in north-western Arnhem Land and on some nearby off-shore islands in the Top End of the Northern Territory.

== Conservation status ==
Grevillea angulata is listed as least concern on the IUCN Red List of Threatened Species. It is widely distributed with a presumed large overall population and does not appear to face any substantial threats, either currently or in the near future.
