= Valuer-General of Tasmania =

Statutory officer in Tasmania, Australia

- Incumbent; Guy Naish since December 2022
- Department of Natural Resources and Environment Tasmania
- Appointer: Governor of Tasmania
- Term length: five (5) years with extensions at the discretion of the Governor
- Constituting instrument: Valuation of Land Act 2001 (Tas)
- Formation: 2001
- First holder: Lou Ray
- Deputy: Deputy Valuer-General
- Salary: Not publicly disclosed
- Website: https://nre.tas.gov.au/land-tasmania/office-of-the-valuer-general

The Valuer-General of Tasmania is a statutory officer appointed by the Government of Tasmania under the Valuation of Land Act 2001 (Tas). The Valuer-General is responsible for overseeing Tasmania's land valuation system, ensuring accurate, impartial, and independent valuations of land and property. These valuations play a critical role in supporting Tasmania's taxation framework, municipal ratings, and other property-related decisions. The office also provides expertise in infrastructure planning, fosters collaborative stakeholder engagement, and supports effective land management strategies.

The Valuer-General is responsible for setting standards and formulating policies that govern the land valuation system. This ensures consistency and reliability across municipal and state land assessments. Supported by the Office of the Valuer-General, the position also oversees compliance with regulations, resolves disputes, and delivers valuation services for taxation, municipal ratings, and property land acquisition.

== History of the office ==
The Valuer-General of Tasmania has a long-standing responsibility for ensuring uniformity, accuracy, and equity in land valuations across the state. The position was formalised under the Valuation of Land Act 2001 (Tas) but traces its origins back to earlier legislative frameworks designed to support the Government of Tasmania in managing land as a critical public asset.

Initially, the office focused on facilitating consistent valuations for land tax in Australia and municipal rates, which were foundational to Tasmania's taxation system. Over the years, the Valuer-General's role has expanded to include oversight of land acquisition valuations, strategic advice on infrastructure planning, and support for sustainable land use planning initiatives.

With advancements in technology, the office has adopted digital tools such as GIS mapping and the LISTmap platform to enhance the accessibility and accuracy of valuation data. This modernisation has allowed the office to streamline processes, address stakeholder concerns, and improve compliance with evolving urban planning and environmental policies.

The office continues to play a pivotal role in balancing Tasmania's economic needs with sustainable land management practices, ensuring that property valuations align with dynamic market trends and legislative requirements. By fostering transparency and consistency, the Valuer-General's office has become an essential component of Tasmania's public administration framework.

== Current Valuer-General ==
Guy Naish was appointed as the Valuer-General of Tasmania in December 2022. In this role, he oversees all land and property valuations across Tasmania, ensuring compliance with the Valuation of Land Act 2001 (Tas).

In addition to his Tasmanian responsibilities, Naish has an additional statutory appointment in the state of NSW and serves as a Hardship Review Panel Member under the Land Acquisition (Just Terms Compensation) Act 1993 (NSW), where he advises government around fair outcomes for landowner initiated hardship applications.

His work includes implementing robust valuation frameworks to ensure equity and accuracy, supporting major infrastructure projects by providing strategic property advice, and advising government bodies on land valuation policies and strategies to align with legislative and market needs.

== Former Valuers-General ==
The role of the Valuer-General has been held by several notable individuals:

- Tim Grant (2014–2022)
- Warrick Coverdale (2003–2014)
- Lou Ray (1997–2003)

== Responsibilities of the Valuer-General ==
The Valuer-General of Tasmania is responsible for:

- Conducting property valuations: Ensuring accurate and equitable property valuations across Tasmania for taxation purposes and municipal rating systems. These valuations provide a foundation for the state's revenue framework and local government funding.
- Advising on policies: Providing expert advice on land valuation policies and strategies to support strategic property management. This includes guidance on property market dynamics and compliance with legislative requirements.
- Managing valuation adjustment factors: Establishing and applying valuation adjustment factors to ensure property assessments reflect current market trends, maintaining fairness and consistency in land tax and municipal rates.
- Supporting infrastructure projects: Offering strategic infrastructure planning advice to government and private stakeholders. This involves evaluating the land required for infrastructure projects.
- Maintaining Valuation Rolls: Establishing and maintaining a Valuation Roll for each municipal area under the Valuation of Land Act 2001 (Tas). The values on these rolls are utilized by local governments and the State Revenue Office for rating and taxing purposes.
- Overseeing Valuation Contracts: Managing the competitive tendering system that awards contracts for valuation services under the act and monitoring the quality of valuation services performed by contractors.
- Administering Land Acquisition Processes: Overseeing the acquisition of land by government agencies and assessing compensation for dispossessed landowners under the Land Acquisition Act 1993 (Tas).
- Providing Valuation Advice: Offering professional advice to government departments, local governments, and other entities on property issues, including the sale, purchase, leasing, and management of property assets.
- Custodianship of Property Data: Acting as the custodian and maintaining property and land information datasets.
- Facilitating Objection Processes: Managing the formal legislative process for property owners to object to statutory valuations.

== Governance and legislation ==
The Valuer-General operates under several key legislative frameworks that guide its functions and responsibilities:

- Valuation of Land Act 2001 (Tas): This foundational legislation establishes the duties and powers of the Valuer-General, including oversight of the land valuation system, the application of valuation adjustment factors, and the resolution of disputes related to property valuations in Tasmania. It provides the legal framework for municipal ratings and land tax assessments.
- Land Acquisition Act 1993 (Tas): Governs the processes for compulsory property acquisitions in Tasmania, ensuring fair and equitable compensation. It is a cornerstone for managing property disputes arising from infrastructure projects and public works.

These Acts ensure that the Valuer-General's office operates within a structured and transparent framework, balancing the rights of property owners with the broader needs of government and public infrastructure.

== Public impact ==
The Valuer-General's work has significant public impact by:

- Ensuring fairness and consistency in land tax assessments and municipal ratings.
- Supporting transparency in the Tasmanian property market.
- Facilitating sustainable land use and development to meet state infrastructure goals.

== Recent initiatives ==
- Valuation Adjustment Factors (2023): Adjustments were published for all 29 municipalities in Tasmania to ensure property valuations reflect current market conditions for accurate rating and taxation.
- Stakeholder Engagement: Played a key role in state consultations to align valuation services with Tasmania's infrastructure and development strategies.
