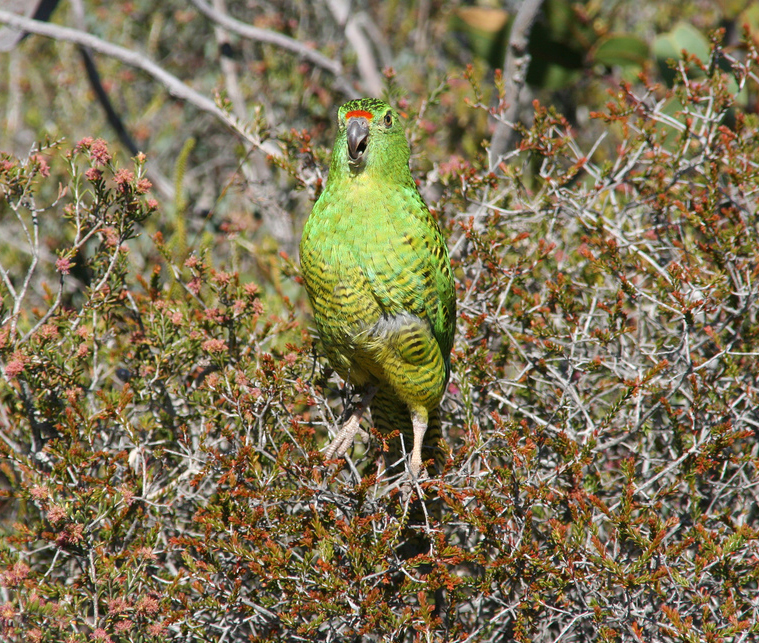
- Western ground parrot, Pezoporus flaviventris

Scientific classification
- Kingdom: Animalia
- Phylum: Chordata
- Class: Aves
- Order: Psittaciformes
- Family: Psittaculidae
- Subfamily: Platycercinae
- Tribe: Pezoporini; Bonaparte, 1837

Genera
- Neopsephotus; Neophema; Pezoporus

= Pezoporini =

Tribe of birds

The tribe Pezoporini is the sister clade of the tribe Platycercini that contains the broad-tailed parrots.

== Taxonomy ==
The inclusion of the following taxon is based on the paper by Joseph et al. (2012).

- Genus Neophema
  - Blue-winged parrot, Neophema chrysostoma
  - Elegant parrot, Neophema elegans
  - Rock parrot, Neophema petrophilla
  - Orange-bellied parrot, Neophema chrysogaster
  - Turquoise parrot, Neophema pulchella
  - Scarlet-chested parrot, Neophema splendida
- Genus Neopsephotus - sometimes included in Neophema
  - Bourke's parrot, Neopsephotus bourkii
- Genus Pezoporus
  - Ground parrot, Pezoporus wallicus
  - Night parrot, Pezoporus occidentalis
