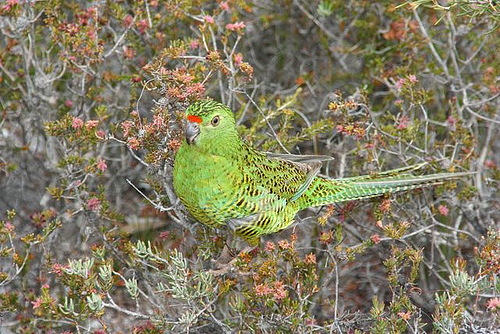
- Subsp. flaviventris
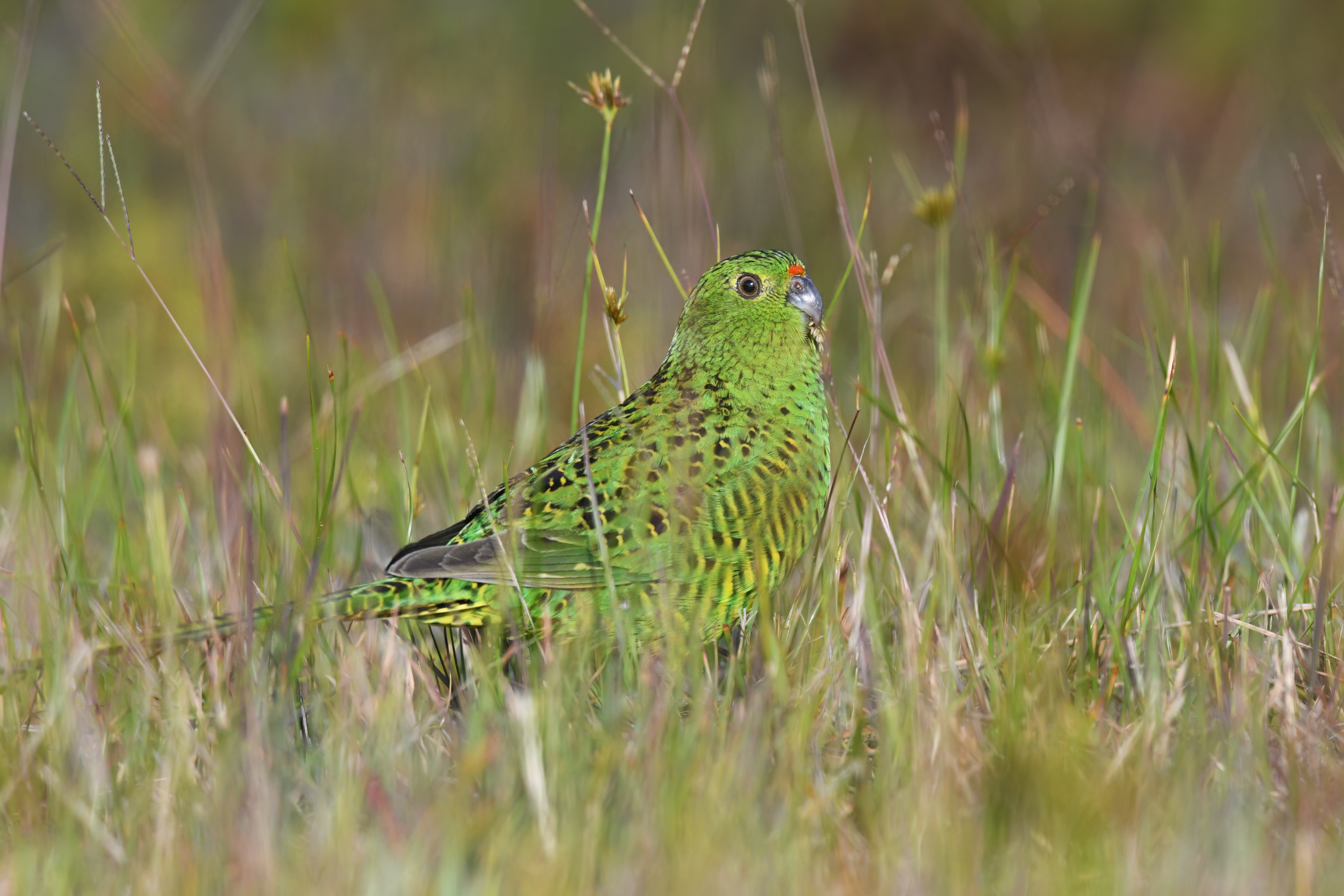
- Subsp. wallicus

Conservation status
- Least Concern (IUCN 3.1)
- CITES Appendix I (CITES)

Scientific classification
- Kingdom: Animalia
- Phylum: Chordata
- Class: Aves
- Order: Psittaciformes
- Family: Psittaculidae
- Genus: Pezoporus
- Species: P. wallicus

Binomial name
- Pezoporus wallicus (Kerr, 1792)

Subspecies
- P. w. flaviventris (North, 1911); P. w. wallicus (Kerr, 1792); P. w. leachi (Mathews, 1912)

= Ground parrot =

Species of bird

The ground parrot (Pezoporus wallicus) is a parrot endemic to Australia. It is one of only four ground-dwelling parrots in the world, the others being the closely related night parrot (Pezoporus occidentalis), the Antipodes parakeet (Cyanoramphus unicolor), and the flightless kākāpō (Strigops habroptilus) from New Zealand.

The colouration of the two Pezoporus species and the kākāpō is similar – yellowish green with darker barring, somewhat reminiscent of the head and back of the wild-type budgerigar.

When disturbed, a ground parrot flies swiftly just above the ground before dropping back into the vegetation. The presence of the bird is often only revealed by its characteristic dusk and dawn call, a clear whistling sequence of notes which rise in pitch before fading. It is silent in flight.

The IOC World Bird List currently recognises three subspecies; the eastern ground parrot (subsp. wallicus), the western ground parrot or Kyloring (subsp. flaviventris) and the Tasmanian ground parrot. (subsp. leachi).

== Description ==
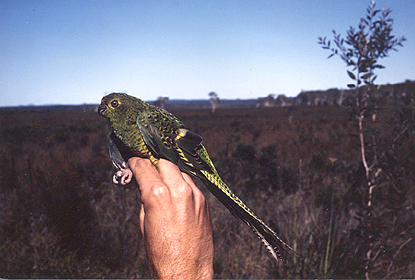
At Cooloolah NP, SE Queensland, Australia

The ground parrot is a medium-sized parrot, growing up to 30 cm long and weighing approximately 80 grams. It is distinctive, with grass green plumage, black streaking on the head and hindneck, prominent pale-yellow wing bars and black and yellow barring on the abdomen, thighs and under-tail coverts. The irises are pale yellow, the bill is dark grey and the feet and legs are flesh-pink. They have a distinguishing bright red band above the cere. Males and females appear alike.

Juveniles can be differentiated from adults in that they are slightly smaller, have duller yellow-olive plumage, absent red bands and thicker, bolder markings on the head and breast. When newly fledged, irises are dark grey-brown to brown in colour.

The eastern and Tasmanian subspecies (wallicus and leachi) differ from the western subspecies (flaviventris) in that they have thicker and more prominent black markings on the head, neck and belly.

== Taxonomy and naming ==
This species belongs to genus Pezoporus, which also includes the night parrot (P. occidentalis). The genus name comes from the Ancient Greek word pezoporos, meaning "walking, going on foot."

Pezoporus belongs to the tribe Pezoporini (ground parrots and allies) which includes Neophema and Neopsephotus. It is part of parrot subfamily Platycercinae and family Psittaculidae, the Old World Parrots.

There are currently three recognised subspecies of P. wallicus

- P. w. flaviventris (North, 1911) - the western ground parrot or Kyloring, as known by its indigenous Noongar name.
- P. w. wallicus (Kerr, 1792) - the eastern ground parrot (nominate subspecies)
- P. w. leachi (Matthews 1912) - the Tasmanian ground parrot

The western ground parrot (P. w. flaviventris) was once considered a separate species from the nominate subspecies based on a mitochondrial DNA study conducted in 2010. However, due to minimal morphological differences between the two and the split being based only on a single mitochondrial gene, the two are now considered to be conspecific and are only recognised as separate subspecies.

== Distribution and habitat ==
This species is endemic to Australia. Each subspecies occurs within its own geographically separated distribution.

Subspecies wallicus, the eastern ground parrot, occurs in fragmented populations in coastal areas of south-eastern Queensland, New South Wales and Victoria. It is distributed as far north as near Fraser or K'gari Island, and as far south as Portland. It was formerly present in South Australia, but has since gone regionally extinct. The eastern ground parrot occurs mainly in dry or moist coastal heathland or sedgeland with a dense foliage cover and a high density of favoured food plants.

Subspecies flaviventris, the western ground parrot, only occurs in two disjunct populations in southern Western Australia, one in Fitzgerald River National Park, the other in Cape Arid National Park and Nuytsland Nature Reserve. It inhabits low, dry or swampy heathland near the coast, usually in areas that have been unburnt for long periods of time.

Subspecies leachi, the Tasmanian ground parrot, is endemic to Tasmania, which hosts the largest population of the species as a whole. The Tasmanian ground parrot population is suspected to consist of more than 100,000 birds.

== Breeding ==
The breeding season of the ground parrot generally occurs from July to December, though eggs have also been recorded in March. Unlike most Australian parrots which nest in tree hollows, this species nests on the ground under a low, dense cover of vegetation including sedges, ferns and shrubs such as Banksia, Xanthorrhoea, Leptospermum and Empodisma. The nest is a shallow depression in dry, well-drained earth and is lined with leaves and stems.

The eggs are glossy, white and oval-shaped, measuring 25.4-26.9 mm. Clutch size is usually 3-4, but can range from as few as 2 to up to 7. Eggs are incubated by the female alone during the 21-24 day incubation period. If the clutch fails, a second may be laid. The male will bring food to the brooding female and nestlings. After approximately 20-28 days, the chicks will fledge and remain near the nest and their father for at least three weeks.

== Conservation status ==
Although the species is listed as "Least Concern" on the IUCN Red List of Threatened Species due to the species' large distribution and population size as a whole, subspecies P. w. flaviventris has been listed as "Critically Endangered" on the EPBC Act List of Threatened Fauna. It is estimated that there are fewer than 150 birds remaining in the wild, making it one of the rarest parrots in Australia.

Subspecies P. w. wallicus has been listed as "Vulnerable" on both the Biodiversity Conservation Act 2016 in New South Wales and the Nature Conservation (Animals) Regulation 2020 in Queensland. In South Australia, it has been listed as "Endangered" on the list of the National Parks and Wildlife Act 1972, despite being locally extinct. Its last confirmed sighting in South Australia was in Port MacDonnell in January 1945

The species is listed in "Appendix I" by CITES.
