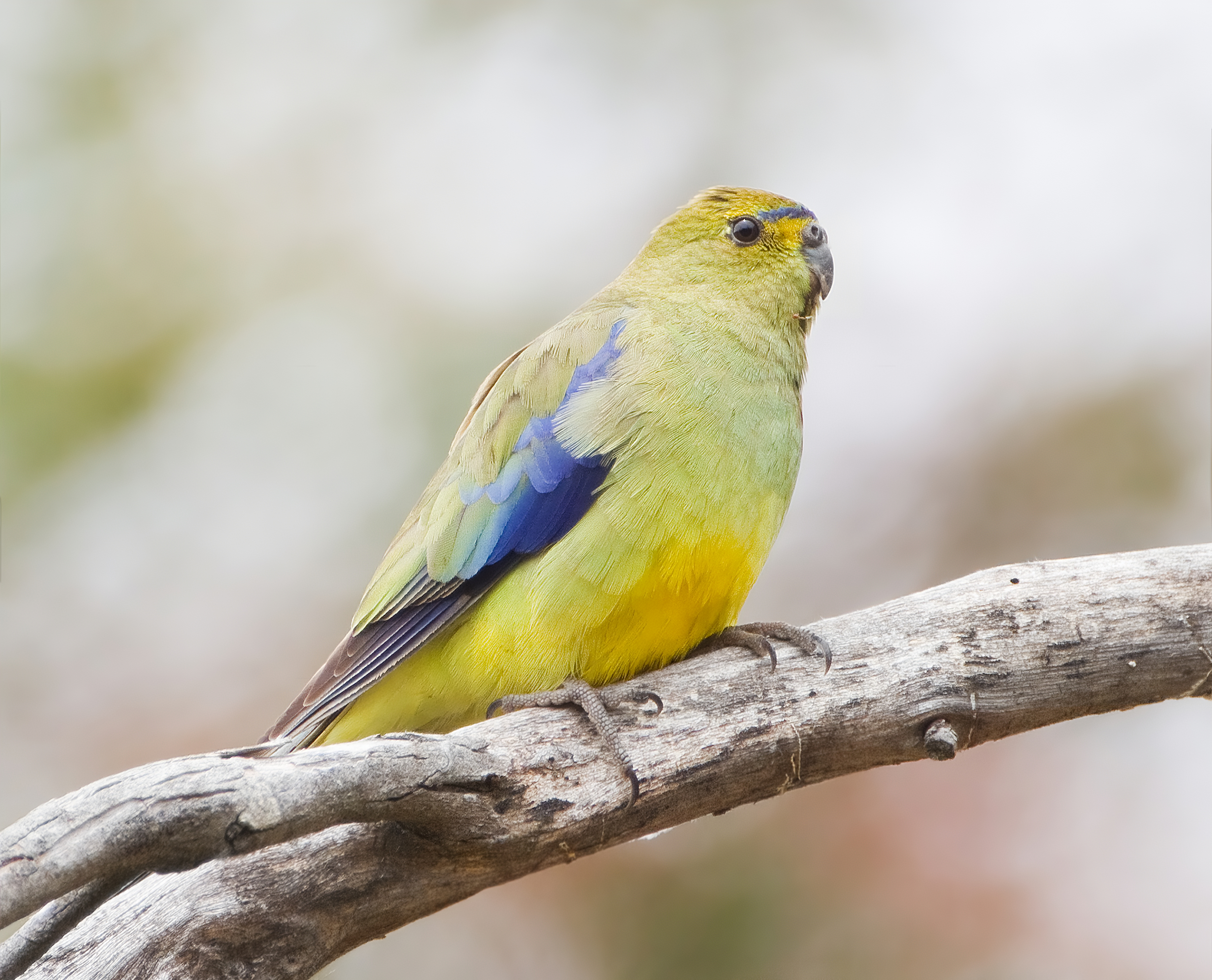
- In Tasmania

Conservation status
- Vulnerable (IUCN 3.1)

Scientific classification
- Kingdom: Animalia
- Phylum: Chordata
- Class: Aves
- Order: Psittaciformes
- Family: Psittaculidae
- Genus: Neophema
- Species: N. chrysostoma

Binomial name
- Neophema chrysostoma (Kuhl, 1820)

= Blue-winged parrot =

Species of bird

The blue-winged parrot (Neophema chrysostoma), also known as the blue-banded parakeet or blue-banded grass-parakeet, is a small parrot found in Tasmania and southeast mainland Australia. It is partly migratory, with populations of blue-winged parrots travelling to Tasmania for the summer. The parrot is sexually dimorphic – the males have more blue on the wings and a two-toned blue frontal band on the head, while females are duller and have more green on the wings and a wingbar. Both sexes have predominantly olive-green plumage. Predominantly a feeder on the ground, the blue-winged parrot mainly eats seeds of grasses. It adapts readily to captivity.

== Taxonomy ==
German naturalist Heinrich Kuhl described the blue-winged parrot in 1820 as Psittacus chrysostomus, noting that it had been confused with the turquoise parrot (N. pulchella). However, the material used to describe it contained specimens of both this species and the elegant parrot. The species' name is from the Ancient Greek words khrysos "golden" and stoma "mouth", from the yellow skin around the eyes. In 1821, Coenraad Jacob Temminck gave the species the name Psittacus venustus, however Kuhl had used this binomial name for the parrot now known as the northern rosella (Platycercus venustus). Gregory Mathews described two subspecies but neither is recognised as distinct today.

Early names included the blue-banded parakeet or blue-banded grass parakeet, taken from the species' blue frontal band. However this plumage is shared by two other members of the genus. It was also known as the Hobart ground parrot in Tasmania from its terrestrial habits. It is also called blue-winged grass parrot or blue winged grass parakeet, as well as its official name of blue-winged parrot.

Within the genus, the blue-winged parrot is classified in the subgenus Neonanodes. Analysis of mitochondrial DNA published in 2021 indicated it is most closely related to the rock parrot, their ancestors most likely diverging between 0.7 and 3.3 million years ago; their common ancestor diverged from the ancestor of the elegant parrot between 0.9 and 3.4 million years ago.

== Description ==
Ranging from 20 to 24 cm long and weighing around 55 g, the parrot is sexually dimorphic—both sexes are predominantly olive-green. The adult male has a two-toned band across the face above but not reaching the eyes—ultramarine above and paler turquoise blue below. Its crown is yellowish, and throat and breast pale green and belly yellow, its wing coverts and under wing coverts are deep blue. The tail is blue-grey. The bill is blue-grey and the iris is brown. The adult female is duller with dull olive underparts and smaller blue on wings and less distinctive frontal band. Juveniles are dull olive green with slate-blue wings and no frontal band.

The greater amount of blue on the wing helps distinguish the Blue-winged parrot from the elegant parrot and the orange-bellied parrot. The latter two species have more yellow-green and bright green plumage overall respectively.

== Distribution and habitat ==
The blue-winged parrot is found across southeastern Australia. In eastern South Australia, it is found north to the Flinders Ranges, and across Victoria. It is more sporadic across central and western New South Wales and into Queensland, as far north as Diamantina National Park. It lives in savannah woodland, grasslands, orchards, farmlands, marshes, heath, dunes, and other open habitats up to 1,200 m (3,937 ft) above sea level. It is one of only three species of parrot that make regular yearly migrations over a sea or ocean, with many members of the species flying between Tasmania, where they breed in spring and summer, and the mainland, where they winter. Some birds, however, do remain in Tasmania over the winter and some remain on the mainland to breed in the summer.

It is a spring visitor to King Island in the Bass Strait.

== Feeding ==
Blue-winged parrots mainly feed on the ground, eating seeds of grasses, including wallaby grass (Austrodanthonia), silver hairgrass (Aira caryophyllea), pale sundew (Drosera peltata) in Tasmania, and Poa caespitosa and the introduced capeweed (Arctotheca calendula) on the mainland, and in Queensland tangled lignum (Muehlenbeckia florulenta). They have been seen feeding alongside the European goldfinch in Victoria. Flock size ranges from pairs in breeding season to up to 2,000 birds just before autumn migration.

== Breeding ==
Breeding takes place from September to January, with one to two broods attempted each season. Blue-winged parrots use hollows of live and dead trees, generally eucalypts, as nesting sites up to 20 m above the ground. The clutch consists of four to six round or oval glossy white eggs, each of which is generally 22 mm long by 19 mm (0.8 by 0.7 in) wide. Incubation takes around 20 days and baby birds spend another 35 days in the nest.

== Parasite ==
The bird louse Forficuloecus greeni has been recovered from the blue-winged parrot.

== In captivity ==
The blue-winged parrot adapts readily to cultivation, and can be maintained in a 3 m (10 ft) communal aviary. It has been crossbred with the elegant and turquoise parrots.
