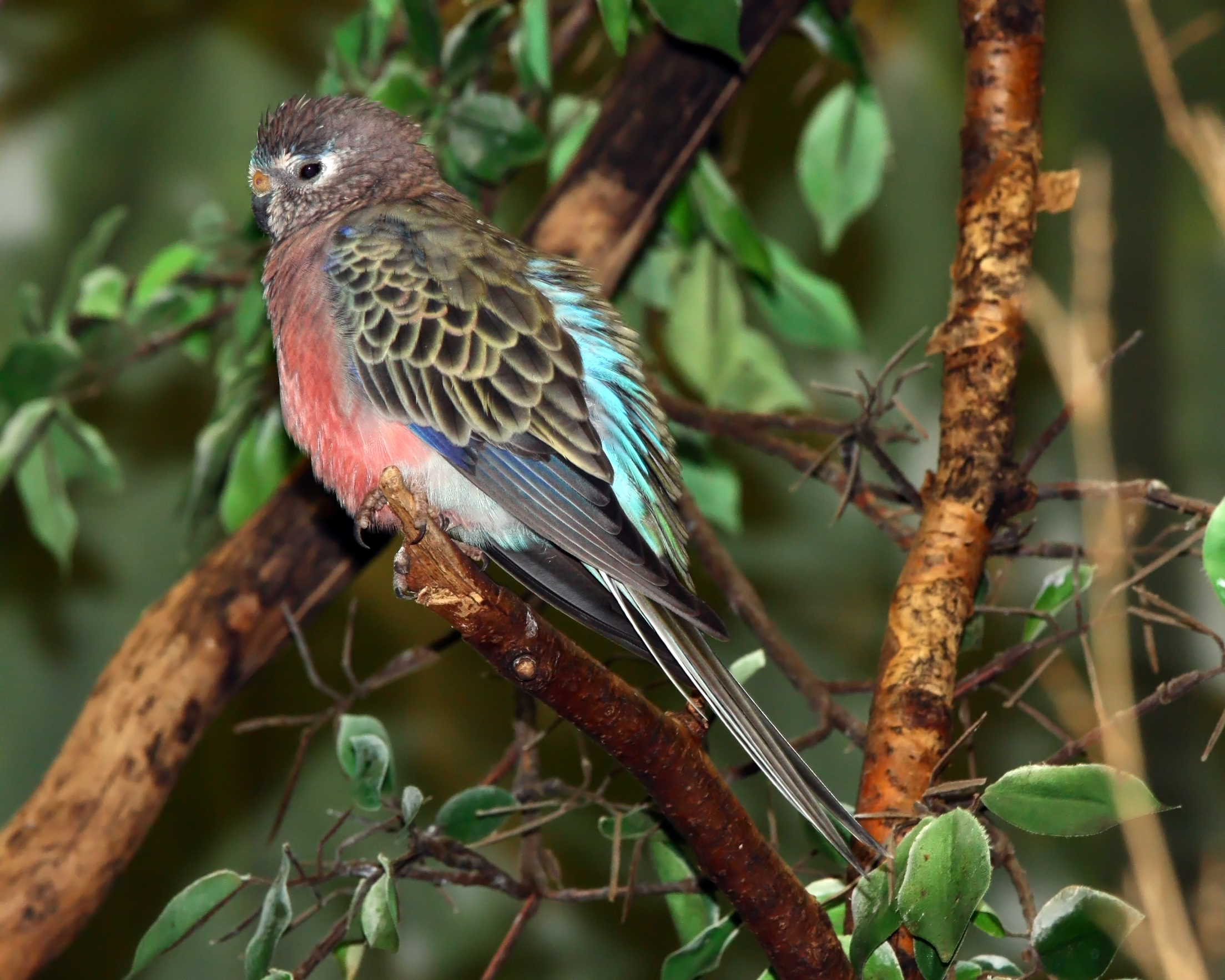

Conservation status
- Least Concern (IUCN 3.1)

Scientific classification
- Kingdom: Animalia
- Phylum: Chordata
- Class: Aves
- Order: Psittaciformes
- Family: Psittaculidae
- Tribe: Pezoporini
- Genus: Neopsephotus; Mathews, 1912
- Species: N. bourkii

Binomial name
- Neopsephotus bourkii (Gould, 1841)

Synonyms
- Neophema bourkii

= Bourke's parrot =

Species of bird

Bourke's parrot (Neopsephotus bourkii, formerly known as Neophema bourkii), also known as the blue-vented parrot, sundown parrot, pink-bellied parrot, Bourke's parakeet, Bourke or "Bourkie", is a small parrot found in Australia and the only species in its genus, Neopsephotus. It is approximately 19 cm long and weighs around 45 grams. It is named after General Sir Richard Bourke, Governor of New South Wales from 1831 to 1837.

== Description ==
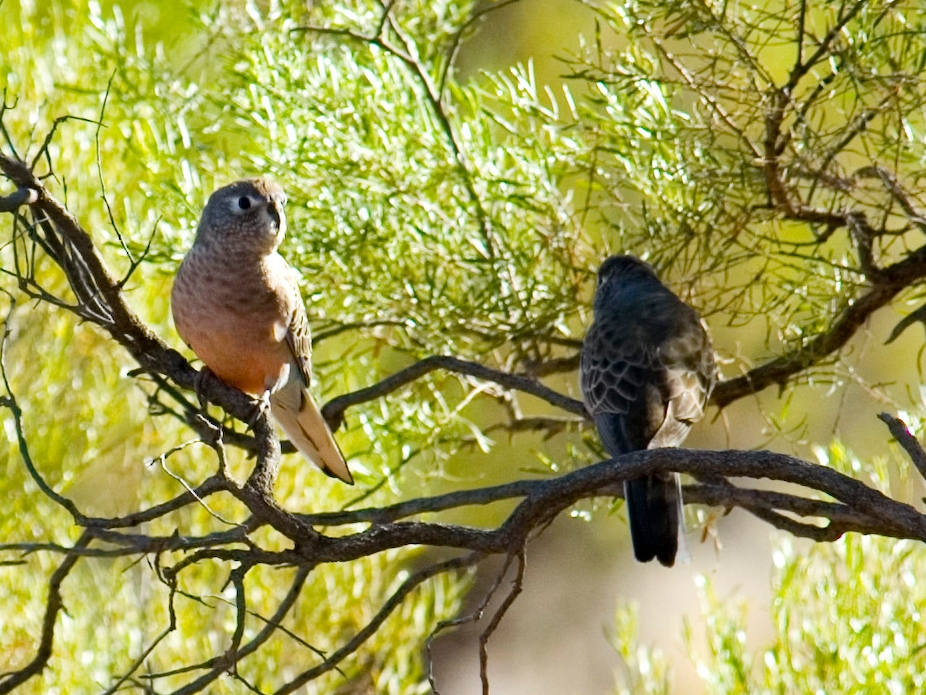
Pair of wild Bourke's parrots, SW Queensland, Australia.

Bourke's parrot is a relatively small species. They tend to vary between 18 cm and 23 cm in length with a tail length of approximately 9 cm. The females of the species tend to be slightly smaller than the males: males of the species weigh between 47 g and 49 g whilst females weigh between 41 g and 49 g. Both sexes look very similar until the age of nine months, after which they come into full plumage colour. In the wild, Bourke's parakeets display an overall brown colouration with a pink abdomen, pinkish breast and a blue rump. The legs are dark-brown, with zygodactyl toes. The bill is yellowish-brown. The adult male has a blue forehead while the adult female has a little or no blue on the forehead. Bourke's parrot's feathers help it blend in with the reddish soil of its arid home.

The bird's call has been described as a "soft twitter". Other sounds made by Bourke's parrot go "chu-vee", "chirrup chirrup", or when alarmed, "kik-kik-kik".

== Taxonomy and naming ==
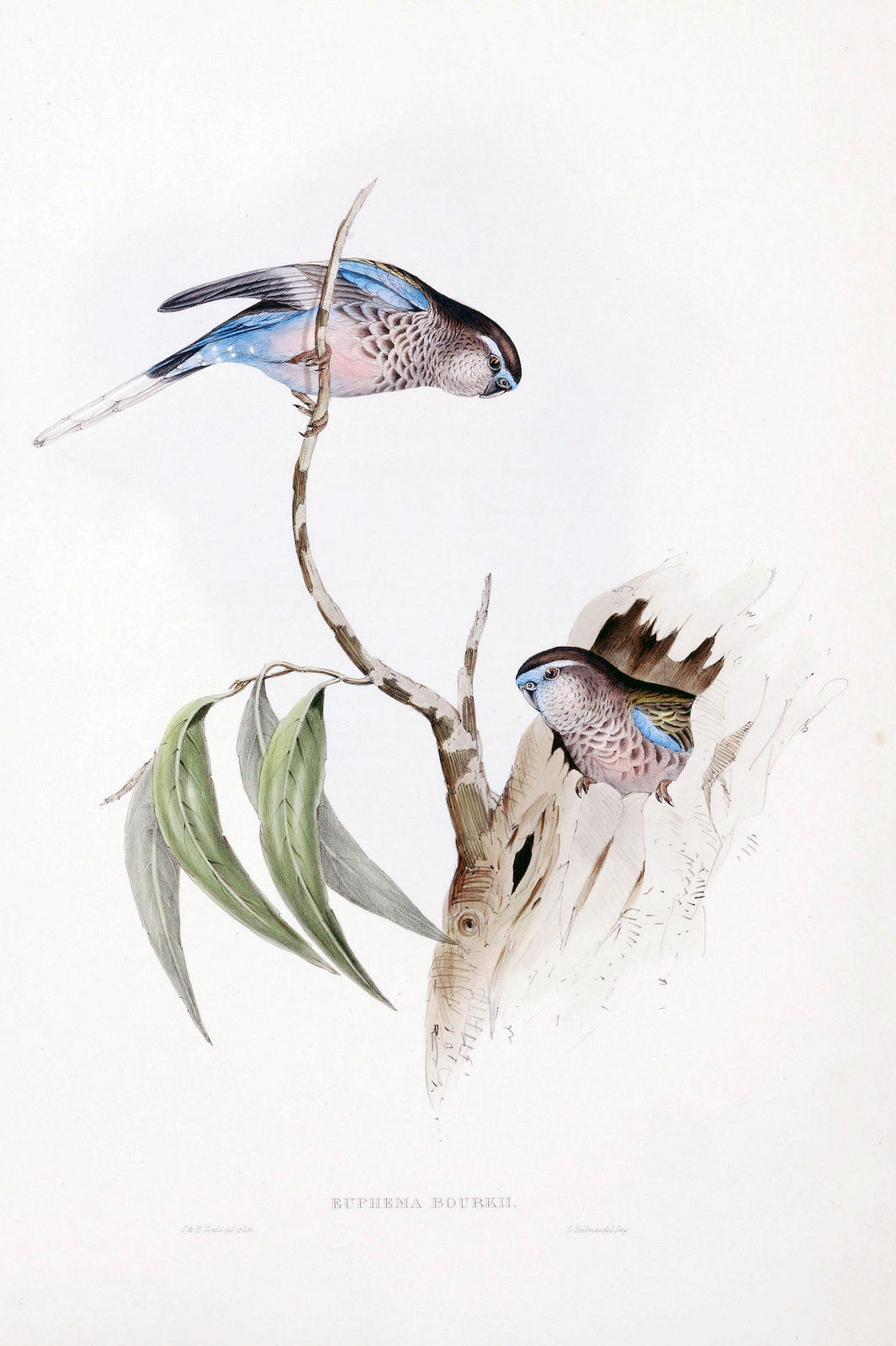
Pair of Bourke's parrots from John Gould's The Birds of Australia.

Its name comes from Sir Thomas L. Mitchell, who spotted the bird in New South Wales in 1835. Mitchell named the species after Sir Richard Bourke, the governor of the state at the time.

The ornithologist John Gould wrote the first scientific description of the Bourke's parrot in 1841. Gould initially classified the species as Euphema bourkii, but it was later classified within the genus Neophema which fully consists of grass parakeets.

In the mid-90s it was reclassified into its own genus, Neopsephotus. This was done because of a lack of evidence that the parrot could hybridize with the rest of the Neophema genus; they are different in colouration and live a nomadic lifestyle throughout the arid regions of Australia. Bourke's parrot is still however referred to as a type of grass parakeet.

== Distribution and habitat ==
Bourke's parrot is native to Australia. As a nomadic species, following water and food sources, it has a vast range. The Bourke's parrot is mainly found in sparsely populated areas; however they have been known to dwell in urban areas as well. These parrots can be found from the South-western parts of Queensland deep into western New South Wales, throughout Central Australia to the far northern parts of South Australia and parts of Western Australia. Bourke's parrot's main habitat consists of areas dominated by Acacia species, particularly mulga, and spinifex plains. The species can also be found in native cypress and open eucalypt woodlands.

== Ecology and behaviour ==
Bourke's parrot has been described as both arboreal and terrestrial; it perches and nests in trees, but also frequently lives on the ground where it can easily camouflage. The flight pattern of Bourke's parakeet is short but swift, interspersed with gliding motions. It usually flies close to the ground in quick bursts, as it travels between trees. The bird's wing beat is minimal and produces an audible whirring sound.

In the wild it tends to live in pairs or small groups, ranging from approximately four to six. Larger flocks ranging in the hundreds are also made by the species, particularly during times of drought.

=== Breeding ===
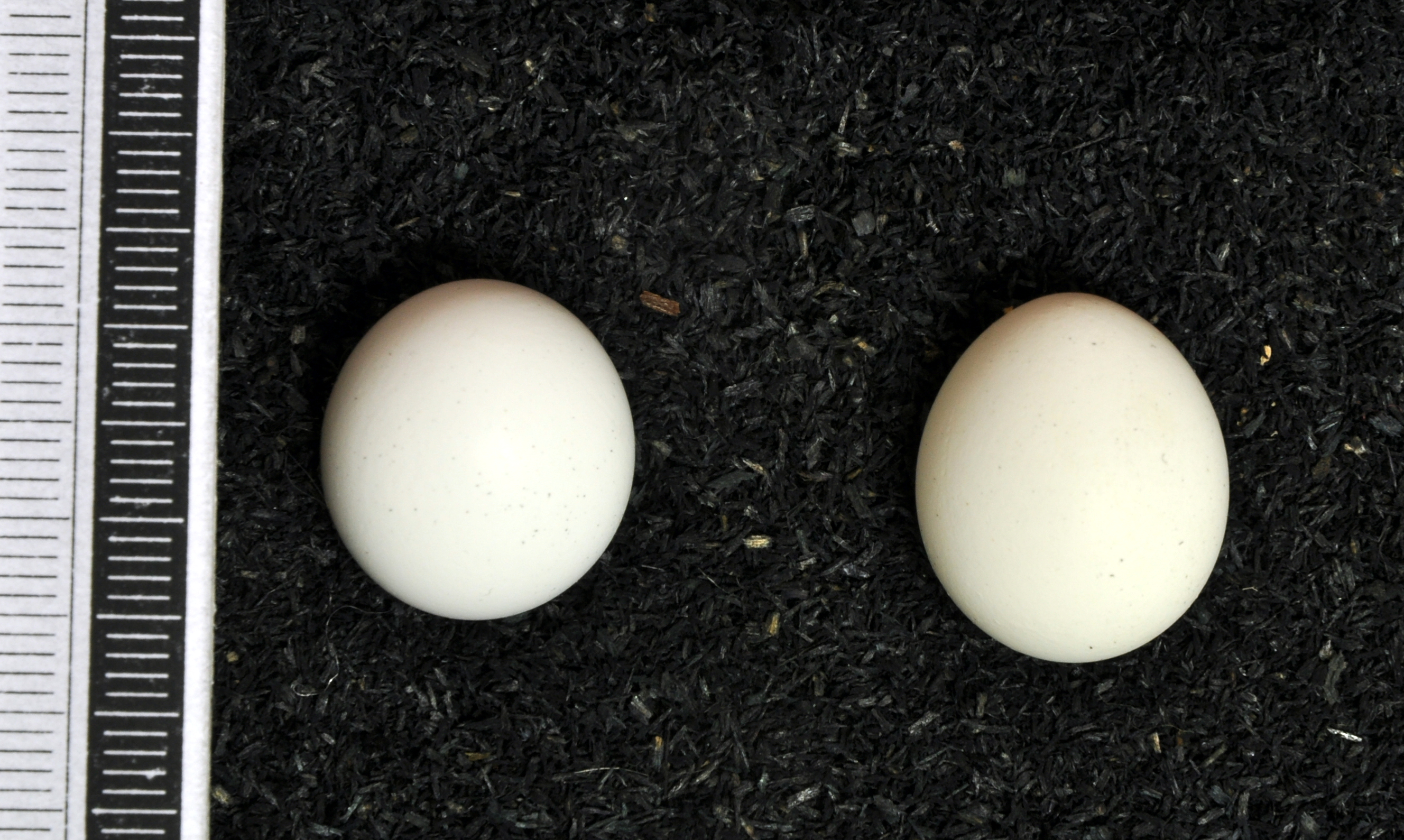
Eggs, Collection Museum Wiesbaden

During the nesting season, males are highly territorial, chasing away any potential intruders or threats. Breeding season for Bourke's parrot usually occurs between the months of August and October, but can also draw out into December, depending on the season and availability of resources.

Bourke's parrots are monogamous, staying with a single partner. Their nests tend to be situated from 1 metre to 3 metres above ground level in hollow limbs of the mulga tree or other acacia species. Eggs are generally laid on a bed of decayed wood at the bottom of the tree hollow. Bourke's parrot has a clutch of 3 to 6 eggs, which are incubated by the female for 18–19 days. During this period, she is fed by the male parrot, only leaving the nest to find water or to defecate.

Once the chicks hatch, both parents feed their young. Offspring begin fledging at about 4 weeks of age, becoming fully independent around 8 to 10 days later.

=== Diet ===
Bourke's parrots forage on the ground and in bushes for grasses and seeds, most active feeding at dusk and dawn. Due to their diet they work as a known seed disperser.

== Aviculture ==
Bourke's parrot is a relatively popular aviary bird. It is particularly common among new bird owners, as it is known for its quiet and passive temperament. Due to their peaceful nature, Bourke's parrots may be kept in captivity with a number of other species including finches, doves and other small parakeets. Bourke's parrots rarely learn to talk. Unlike many other species of parrots, the Bourke's parrot does not climb and instead relies on hopping or flying to reach higher perches. This species typically lives for 10-15 years when kept in captivity, but some individuals do surpass this lifespan.

There are few documented mutations found in captive Bourke's parrots; such as yellow, Isabel, fallow and pink or rosa. The rosa mutation is particularly common in aviculture, lending to the popular name "Rosy Bourke". Additionally, while Bourke's parakeets lacking a color mutation can often be sexed visually, males and females with a color mutation cannot.

There have been recorded instances of Bourke's parrot producing hybrids with the scarlet-chested parrot (Neophema splendida).

== Threats ==
Bourke's parrot is not listed as threatened by the IUCN. The main threat faced by this particular species is predation from red foxes (Vulpes vulpes) introduced from Europe and feral cats (Felis silvestris). Drought and clearing of watering holes can have significant impacts on the population. However, there have not been a noticeable decline in numbers; rather they are steadily increasing. This is likely due to the reasoning that their habitat is so far spread and they have little contact with predators compared to other parakeet species.

== Gallery ==
Eulo Bore, SW Queensland, Australia

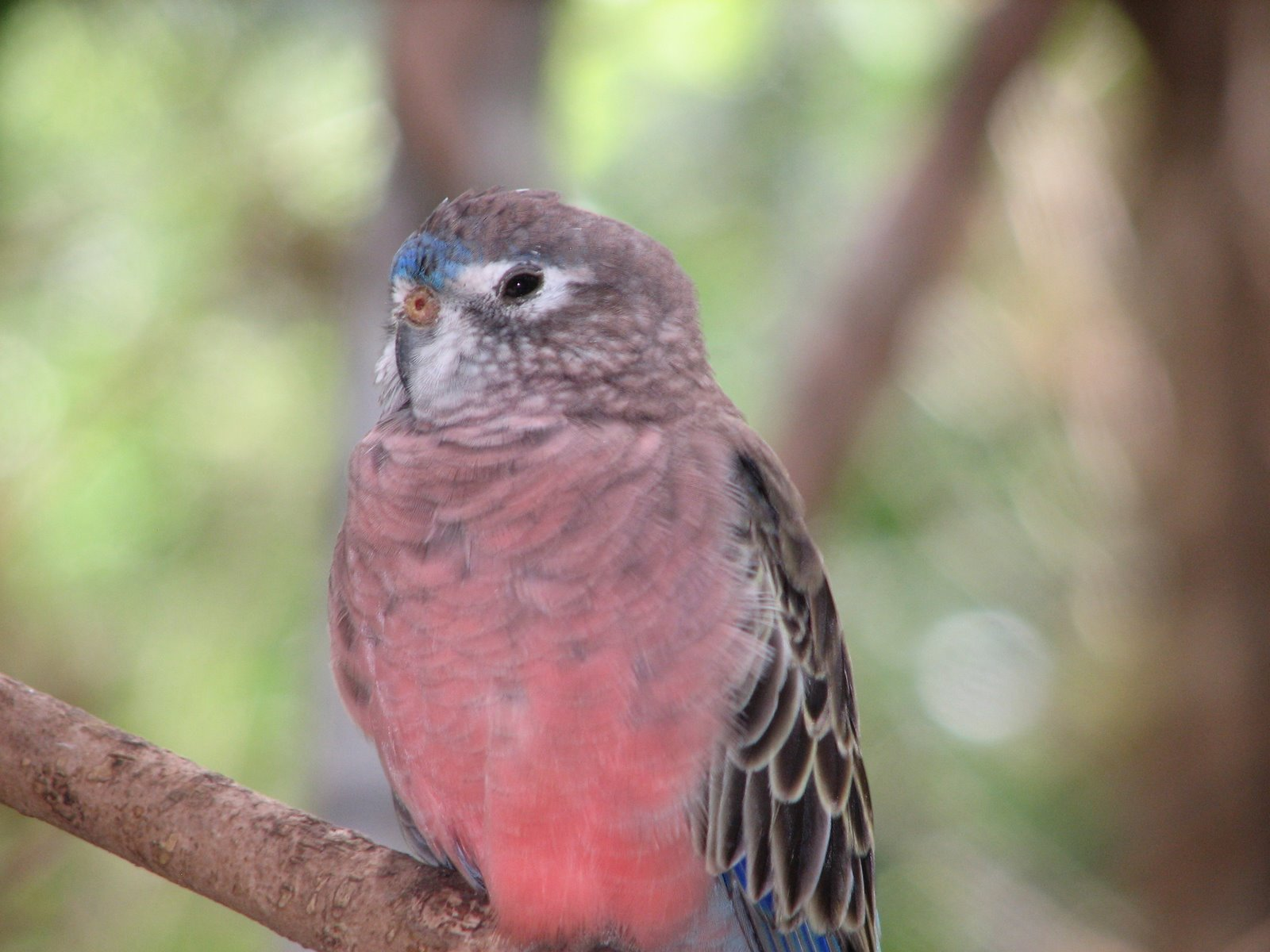
At Flying High Bird Habitat, Queensland.

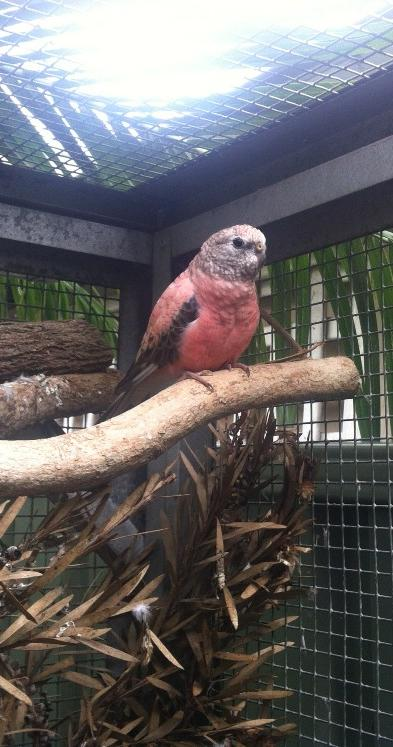
Rosa mutation
