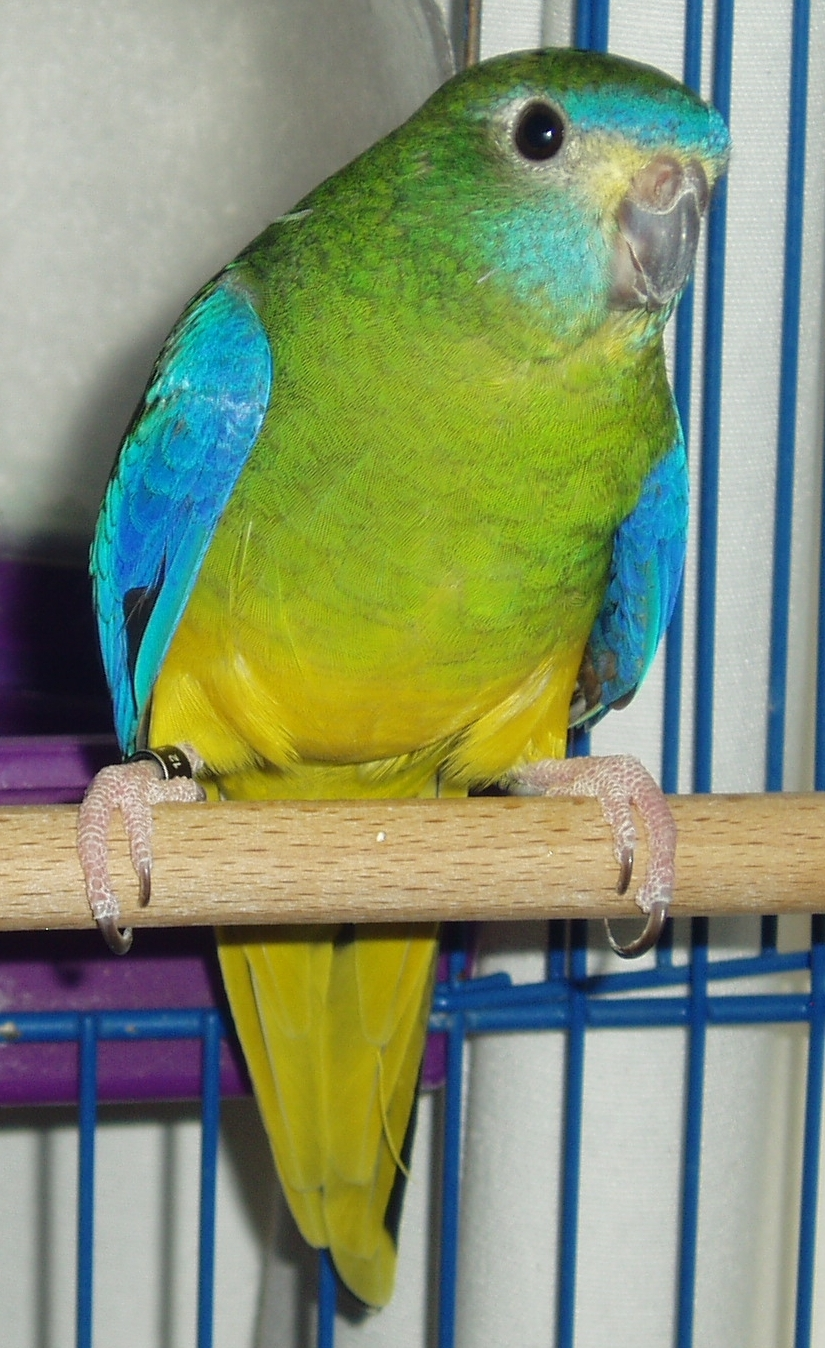
- Turquoise parrot, female

Scientific classification
- Kingdom: Animalia
- Phylum: Chordata
- Class: Aves
- Order: Psittaciformes
- Family: Psittaculidae
- Tribe: Pezoporini
- Genus: Neophema; Salvadori, 1891

Type species
- Psittacus pulchellus Shaw, 1792

Species
- 6 or 7; see text

Synonyms
- Euphema

= Neophema =

Genus of birds

The genus Neophema is an Australian genus with six or seven species. They are small, dull green parrots differentiated by patches of other colours, and are commonly known as grass parrots. The genus has some sexual dichromatism, with males having brighter hues.

== Taxonomy ==
Sometimes the broad-tailed parrots are considered a subfamily. In this case, Neophema and Bourke's parrot are united in the tribe Neophemini. mtDNA sequence data (Miyaki et al. 1998) suggests that the former may be correct, but the latter almost certainly is not. Rather, it appears, the group would need to include more closely related forms, such as the budgerigar and the Pezoporus ground-parrots. However, while Joseph et al. (2011) also found Neophema to be related both Bourke's parrot and ground-parrots and form part of the tribe Pezoporini, they are not related to the budgerigar.

Analysis of mitochondrial DNA published in 2021 indicated the ancestors of Bourke's parrot and the remaining Neophema parrots most likely diverged between 6.4 and 8 million years ago; the Neophema lineage diverged again, with one giving rise to the turquoise and scarlet-chested parrots, and the other to the four remaining species. Of these four, the ancestor of the orange-bellied parrot diverged next, then the elegant parrot, leaving the blue-winged and rock parrot as each other's closest relatives.

=== Species ===
The genus Neophema contains the following six (or seven) species:

Image	Common name	Scientific name
	Blue-winged parrot	Neophema chrysostoma
	Elegant parrot	Neophema elegans
	Rock parrot	Neophema petrophila
	Orange-bellied parrot	Neophema chrysogaster
	Turquoise parrot	Neophema pulchella
	Scarlet-chested parrot	Neophema splendida
	Bourke's parrot	Depending on the author, Bourke's parrot (Neopsephotus bourkii) may also be considered a member of the genus Neophema, while others place it in the monotypic genus Neopsephotus.

== Aviculture ==
The scarlet-chested parrot, turquoise parrot and elegant parrot are all commonly raised and bred in captivity with a number of unusual colour forms arising. The members of this genus are not altogether easy to keep, being tender birds that may die without apparent cause, succumbing to mobbing by more robust aviary mates or diseases. This has hampered captive propagation efforts, e.g. in the case of the critically endangered orange-bellied parrot.

They are certainly not "beginner's birds" and will usually not thrive if they are not provided with a spacious aviary where a small flock can be kept in company of a few other small and harmless birds. It is possible to keep a pair or a single bird in a cage, but they will be sluggish and unhealthy if they are not let out to fly and socialize with humans frequently. Trade in wild-caught specimens is strongly restricted; in any case, these should be rejected because they are extremely tough to accustomize to aviary conditions. It is usually impossible, even for expert aviculturalists, to keep wild-caught birds alive for more than a few months. Captive-bred birds of several species are available, and these are far more hardy, though inexperienced aviculturalists should avoid them nonetheless.

Popular in Australia and internationally, Neophema are sometimes referred to as 'grass parakeets' in avicultural literature. The most easily bred are Bourke's parrot (as Neophema), the scarlet-chested parrot (N. splendida), the turquoise parrot (N. pulchella), and the elegant parrot (N. elegans). The most difficult and uncommon captive is the rock parrot (N. petrophila). Aside from Bourke's parrot, all are distinguished as predominantly green birds. The orange-bellied parrot has not been commercially available due to rarity and legal restriction.

== Etymology ==
The genus name comes from νέος (new) and Euphema (the original, now synonimised name for this genus
