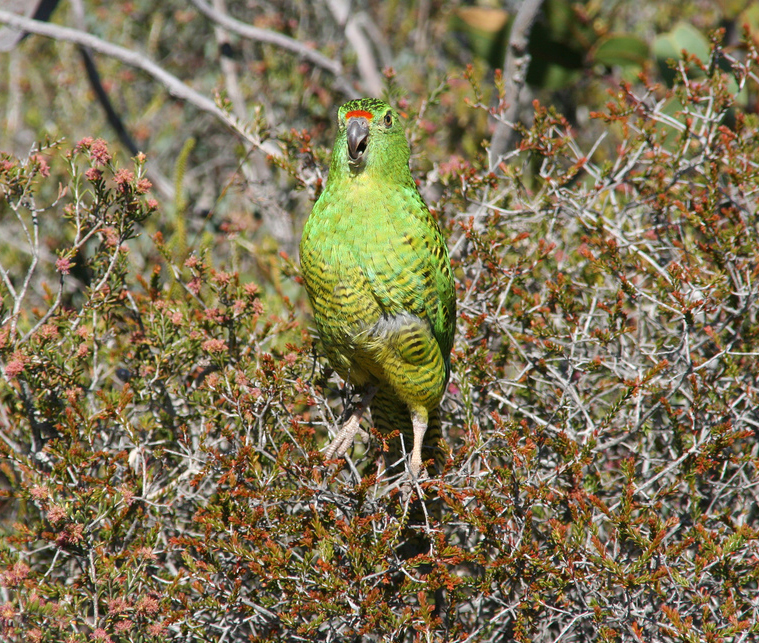
- vocalising ground parrot

Scientific classification
- Kingdom: Animalia
- Phylum: Chordata
- Class: Aves
- Order: Psittaciformes
- Family: Psittaculidae
- Tribe: Pezoporini
- Genus: Pezoporus; Illiger, 1811

Type species
- Psittacus formosus Latham, 1790

Species
- Pezoporus occidentalis Pezoporus wallicus
- Species distributions: Night parrot (P. occidentalis): light red = historical; red dots = recent sightings; Eastern ground parrot (P. w. wallicus): orange; Western ground parrot (P. w. flaviventris): yellow = historical; green = current

Synonyms
- Geopsittacus

= Pezoporus =

Genus of birds

Pezoporus is a genus of parrot endemic to Australia. It contains two species: the night parrot (P. occidentalis) and the ground parrot (P. wallicus) which is divided into three subspecies. The night parrot was previously separated in a distinct genus, Geopsittacus. The genus is part of the tribe Pezoporini and subfamily Platycercinae.

== Species list ==
- Genus Pezoporus

Genus Pezoporus – Illiger, 1811 – two species
Common name	Scientific name and subspecies	Range	Size and ecology	IUCN status and estimated population
Night parrot	Pezoporus occidentalis (Gould, 1861)	recent sightings from Diamantina National Park, Pilbara region, Western Australia and Cloncurry, Queensland.	Size: About 22–25 cm long. Predominantly a yellowish green, mottled with dark brown, blacks and yellows. Habitat: Interior of Australia, Diet:	CR
Ground parrot	Pezoporus wallicus (Kerr, 1792) Three subspecies: P. w. flaviventris (North, 1911); P. w. wallicus (Kerr, 1792); P. w. leachi (Matthews 1912)	Coastal regions of south-eastern Australia and Tasmania	Size: About 30 cm long. Generally green plumage, with black and yellow marking. Narrow orange-red band to forehead. Underside of flight-feathers with pale yellow wing-stripe. Bill, cere and feet greyish brown. Habitat: Diet:	LC
