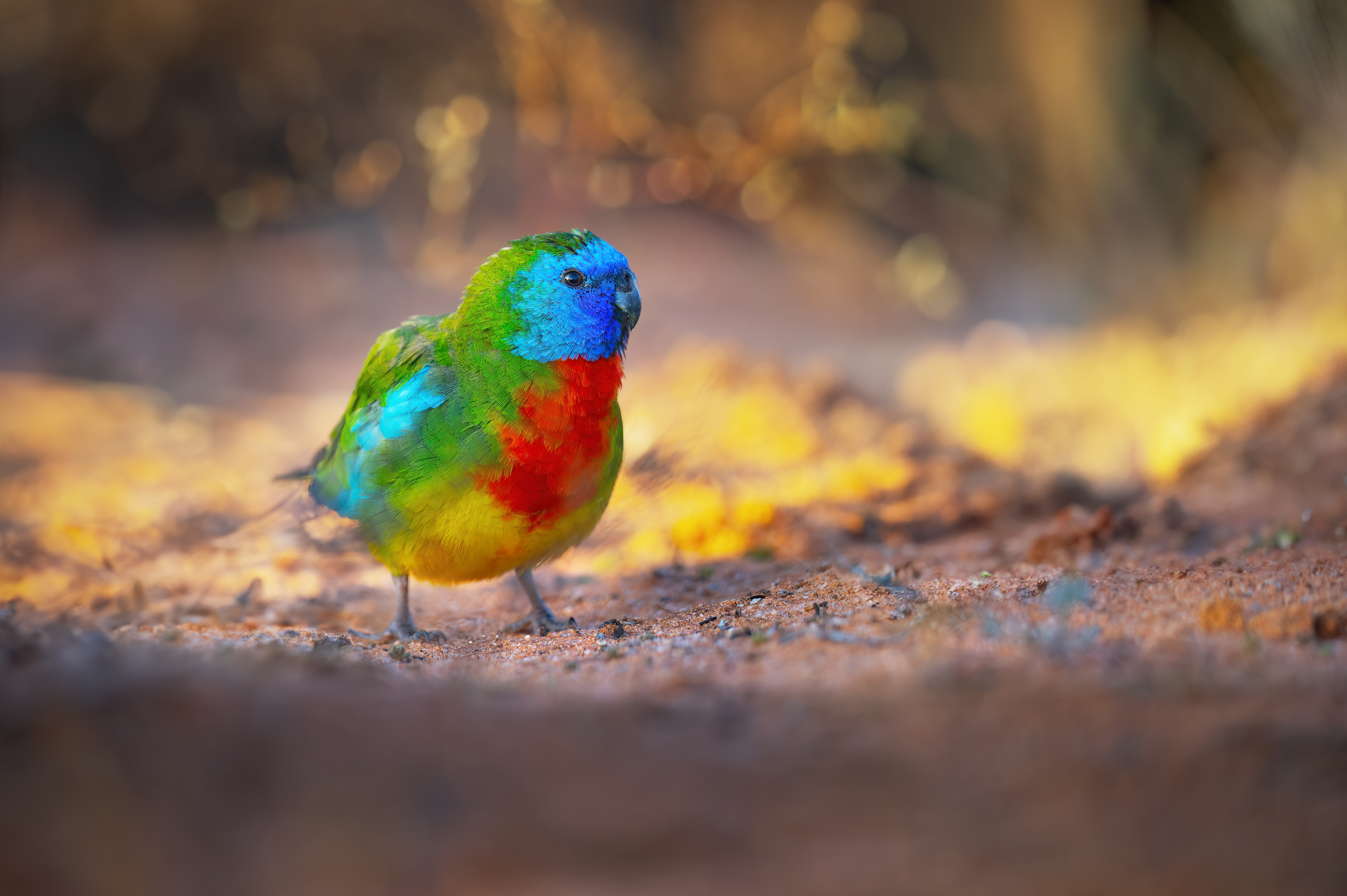
- A male scarlet-chested parrot at Gluepot Reserve, South Australia

Conservation status
- Least Concern (IUCN 3.1)

Scientific classification
- Kingdom: Animalia
- Phylum: Chordata
- Class: Aves
- Order: Psittaciformes
- Family: Psittaculidae
- Genus: Neophema
- Species: N. splendida

Binomial name
- Neophema splendida (Gould, 1841)

= Scarlet-chested parrot =

Species of bird

The scarlet-chested parrot (Neophema splendida), known alternately as scarlet-breasted parrot, orange-throated parrot or splendid parrot, is a parrot endemic to central South Australia and inland southern Western Australia. The species is sexually dimorphic; the male has a bright blue face and scarlet chest and yellow underparts, amid overall green plumage, while the female is similar but lacks the red chest. These nomadic parakeets move readily from the Great Victoria Desert region into neighbouring areas. These interruptions are triggered by a search for more favourable conditions. They can survive quite well without access to drinking water, however, as succulent plants help meet much of their fluid requirement. They feed mainly on grass seeds and are most commonly sighted in spinifex.

== Taxonomy ==
The scarlet-chested parrot was originally named by the renowned ornithologist and artist John Gould in 1841 as Euphema splendida. Its specific name splendida is the Latin adjective "splendid". No subspecies are recognised.

Italian ornithologist Tommaso Salvadori erected the new genus Neophema in 1891, placing the scarlet-chested parrot within it and giving it its current scientific name. It is one of six species of grass parrot in the genus Neophema, and is most closely related to the turquoise parrot. The two are an allopatric species pair, and are the only two species in the genus to exhibit marked sexual dimorphism.

Common names include scarlet-chested parrot, orange-throated parrot, splendid parrot, scarlet-breasted parrot, and scarlet-chested parakeet in aviculture.

== Description ==
Measuring 19–21 cm (8 in) in length, this small vibrant and brightly coloured parrot is sexually dimorphic. The male has a scarlet chest, a cobalt blue face, and bright green upperparts. The lower breast and underparts are yellow, and the wing coverts are pale blue. The tail is green, the eyes are brown and the bill is blackish, and legs are brown-grey. The female likewise has a blue face, although the coloration is less extensive, green upperparts and green breast, with yellow underparts. Immature birds are duller versions of their respective adult forms. Males begin to get red plumage on their chest from around two or three months of age, though do not complete their red chest until fifteen to eighteen months old.

The female resembles the female turquoise parrot (N. pulchella) of eastern Australia, but can be distinguished by the blue lores and paler blue wing patch.

The call is a soft twittering, quieter than other members of the genus Neophema.

== Distribution and habitat ==
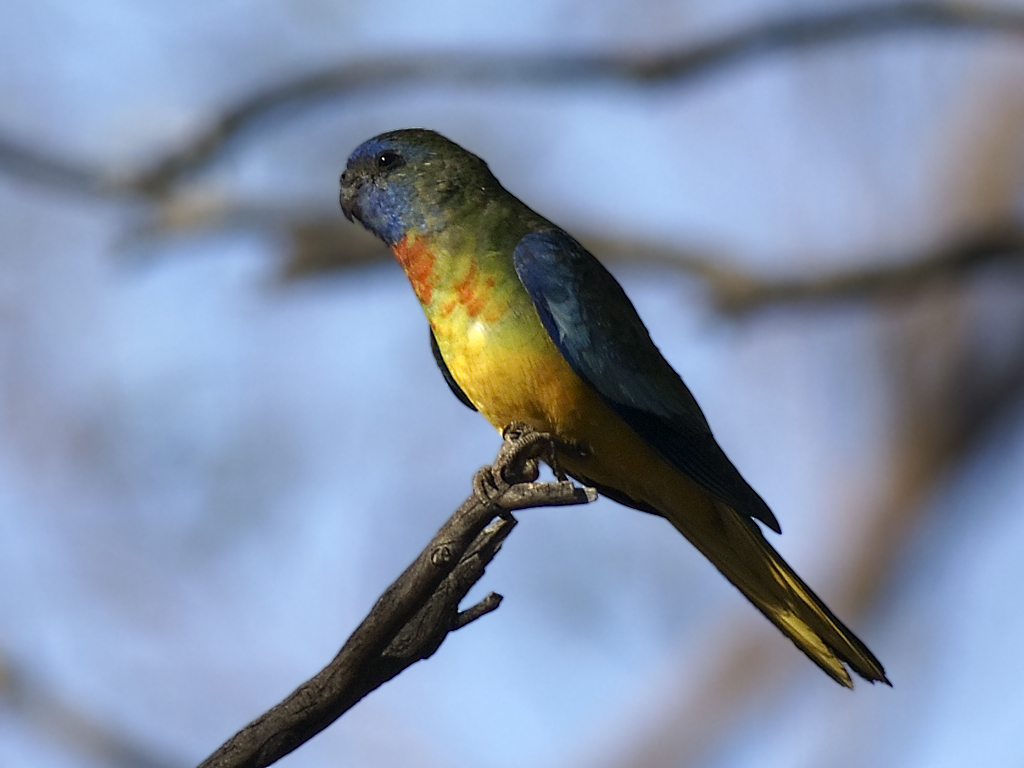
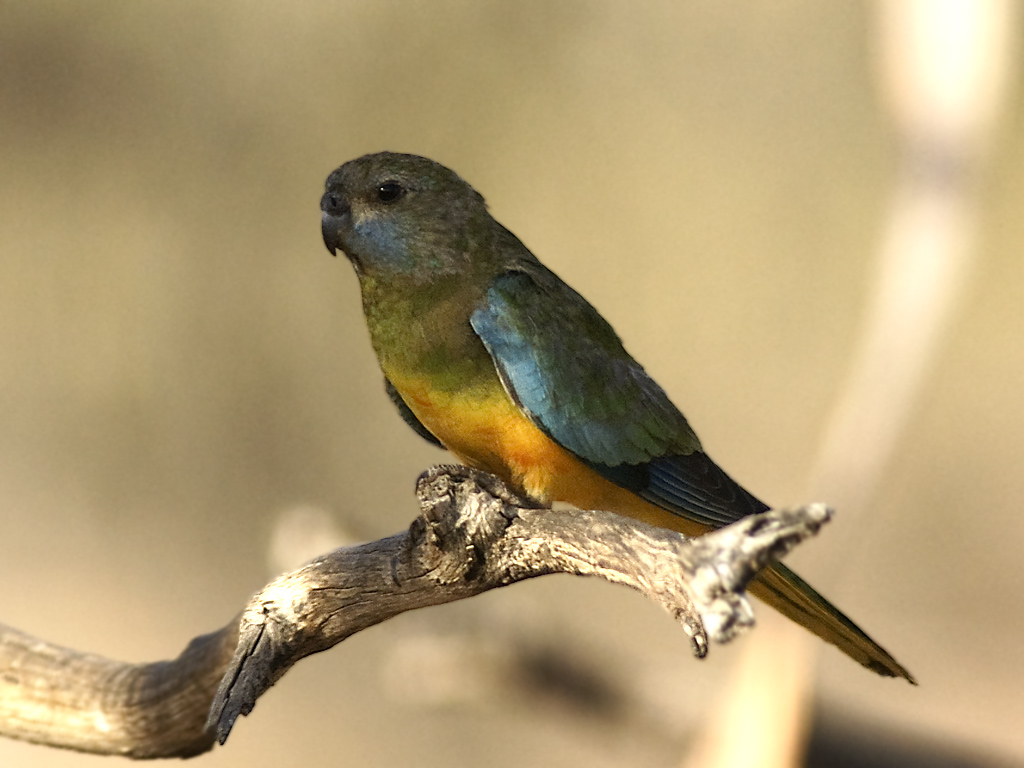
Immature male on the left and an immature female on the right at Gluepot Reserve, South Australia

The scarlet-chested parrot is sparsely scattered across the dryer southern parts of the Australian continent, from Pingelly, Corrigin and Laverton in Western Australia east across South Australia and into the southern Northern Territory and into far western New South Wales. It has been classified as vulnerable in New South Wales, the dangers highlighted include the harvesting of trees that are potential and actual nesting sites, as larger trees are necessary for suitable hollows, possible trapping for the pet trade, and grazing by stock and feral animals. They inhabit dry Eucalyptus and Acacia scrubland and grassland, including Atriplex and Triodia. True estimates of rarity or abundance are difficult to determine; although the bird is brightly coloured, it is secretive and easily overlooked.

== Feeding ==
Seeds of grasses make up the diet, and they are thought to utilise succulent plants such as Calandrinia to meet much of their fluid requirement.

== Breeding ==
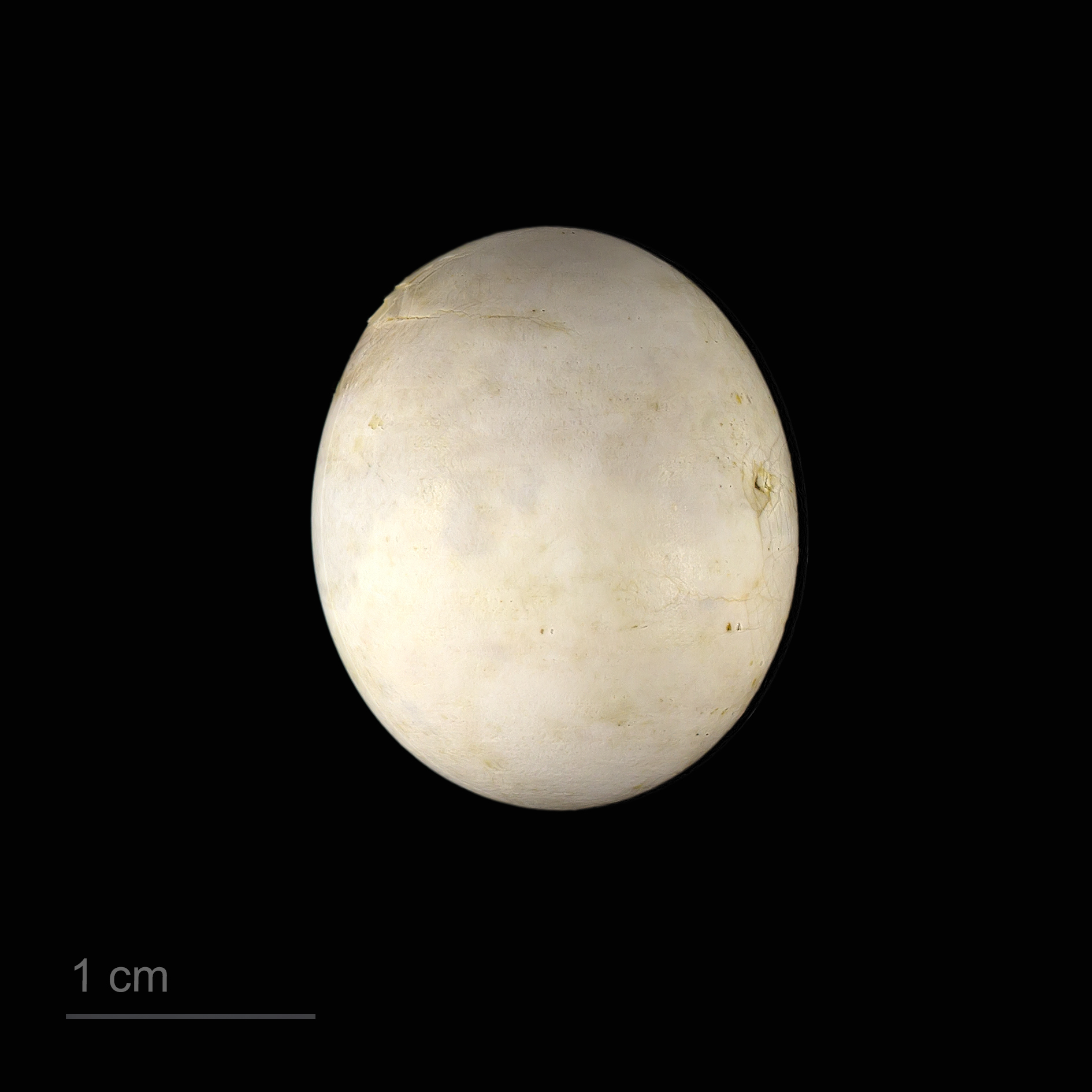
Neophema splendida - MHNT

Breeding season is from August to October or after rainfall, with one or occasionally two broods raised depending on rainfall. A hollow in a small tree, often a mulga or eucalypt, is utilised for nesting, and a clutch of four to six round white eggs measuring 23×19 mm is laid there.

== Aviculture ==
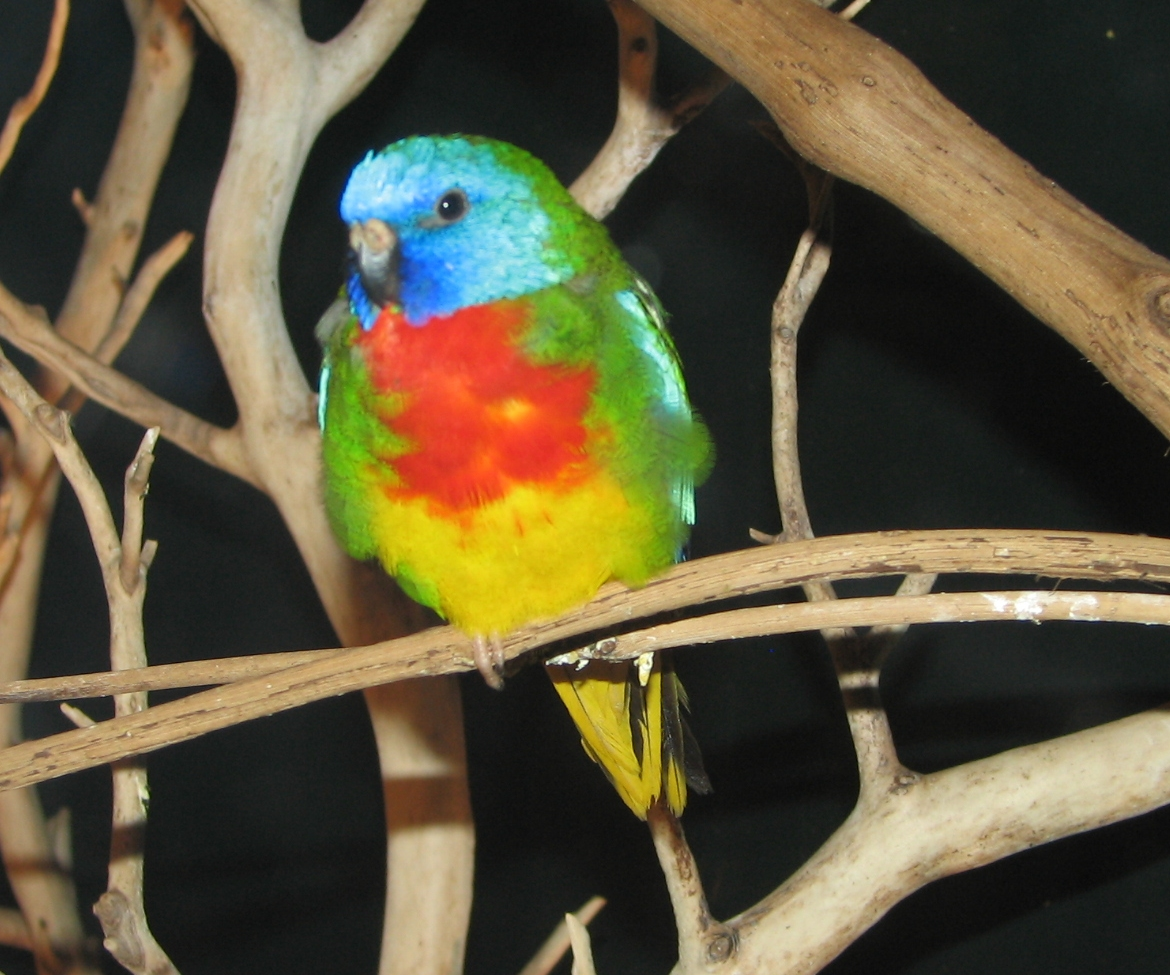
Adult male at Cincinnati zoo, USA

The scarlet-chested parrot is becoming more common in captivity, and is one of the more popular species of the genus Neophema in captivity both in Australia and overseas. Their quiet temperament and small size increase their appeal as aviary birds. Many mutations are seen, including the red-fronted, par blue, sea green (Sydney Blue), white fronted blue (Recessive), cinnamon (sex-linked), and more rarely lutino and fallow. Opaline (sex-link) and Edged (dominant) mutations are also now available in most countries. Although the species has more mutations than any other member of the genus, they tend to be frail healthwise and short-lived. Scarlet-chested parrots are also vulnerable to Candida infections in aviculture. Since they are prone to Candida infections, this is best addressed in their diet. Remove everything from their diet that encourages fungal growth, like refined flour (most commercial egg foods are flour-based) and sugar (most ripe fruits). Add as many natural antifungals to their diet as you can. Fresh crushed garlic is an excellent antifungal. Also herbs like oregano, thyme and rosemary. With proper husbandry and a more natural approach to their diet, Scarlet-chested parakeets prove to be hardy and long-lived.
