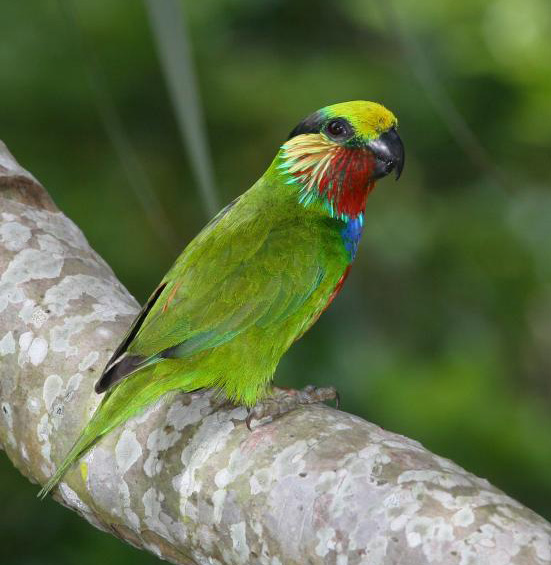
- Edwards's fig parrot

Scientific classification
- Kingdom: Animalia
- Phylum: Chordata
- Class: Aves
- Order: Psittaciformes
- Family: Psittaculidae
- Subfamily: Loriinae
- Tribe: Cyclopsittini

Genera
- Cyclopsitta; Nannopsittacus

Synonyms
- Cyclopsittacini Salvadori, 1891; Cyclopsitticini; Opopsittini Mathews, 1912

= Fig parrot =

Tribe of birds

Fig parrots are a small tribe of Australasian parrots named Cyclopsittini in the family Psittaculidae, made up of seven species in two genera (Cyclopsitta and Nannopsittacus). Fig parrots are found on and around the island of New Guinea, within the territories of Indonesia, Papua New Guinea, and tropical Australia.

== Description ==
Fig parrots are small, stocky, arboreal parrots with short, wedge-shaped tails. They possess proportionately large, broad bills and smooth tongues. Sexual dimorphism is typically pronounced, with the exception of Coxen's fig parrot (Cyclopsitta diopthalma coxeni). Those in the genus Cyclopsitta are generally smaller than those in Psittaculirostris.

Their preferred habitats are the tropical and subtropical rainforests, though they can also be found foraging in the surrounding biomes. They can usually be seen flying swiftly in straight lines, well above the tree canopy.

Their diets consist mainly of fruit, particularly their namesake figs. They may supplement these with a variety of other fruits and berries, along with nectar, pollen, insects, and larvae. Fig parrots appear to be capable of detecting the fig syconia that have been implanted with growing fig wasps, and targeting these for their extra nutritional content. They remember particular fruit trees, and return to them repeatedly over months and years.

== Taxonomy ==
The fig parrot group was first proposed in 1891 at family rank, as Cyclopsittacidae, from the type genus Cyclopsitta. This was later downgraded to tribe status and included into the family Psittaculidae.

Molecular phylogenetic studies support a grouping of fig parrots (Cyclopsittini) with the closely related budgerigars (Melopsittacini) and the lories and lorikeets (Loriini) as the subfamily Loriinae. Relationships between the tribes and within the Cyclopsitta and Psittaculirostris remain to be studied in detail.

== Tribe Cyclopsittini ==
The tribe contains two genera:

Image	Genus	Living species
	Cyclopsitta; Reichenbach, 1850	Double-eyed fig parrot, Cyclopsitta diophthalma; Large fig parrot, Cyclopsitta desmarestii; Edwards's fig parrot, Cyclopsitta edwardsii; Salvadori's fig parrot, Cyclopsitta salvadorii
	Nannopsittacus; Mathews, 1916	Dusky-cheeked fig parrot, Nannopsittacus melanogenia; Blue-fronted fig parrot, Nannopsittacus gulielmitertii; Black-fronted fig parrot, Nannopsittacus nigrifrons
