= John Young (naturalist) =

Australian naturalist and cinematographer

John Young is an Australian naturalist and cinematographer.

== Early life ==
John Young grew up on a farm for cattle and sheep in New South Wales. As a boy, he began egg-collecting with his brothers as a hobby. While in his twenties, Young held several jobs, including as an electrician, truck driver, and a fencer.

== Career ==
In the 1990s, Young created John Young Wildlife Enterprises. The company ran birding tours and also produced wildlife films with the aim of documenting rare species of birds.

=== Blue-fronted fig parrot controversy ===
In 2006, Young claimed to have photographed a putative new species or subspecies of fig parrot in southern Queensland, calling it the blue-fronted or blue-browed fig parrot. The photograph, depicting a bird similar to the red-browed fig parrot (Cyclopsitta diophthalma macleayana) with a blue forehead, was published in Brisbane-based newspaper The Courier-Mail. Lindy Nelson-Carr, the then Queensland Minister for Environment, announced the discovery on 7 November 2006 during an event held at Lamington National Park, stating that Young had known of the existence of the parrot for a decade and that the Queensland Parks and Wildlife Service would work with Young to further document the parrot. The authenticity of the photograph was called into doubt by a forensic photography expert from RMIT University, who noticed details indicating that the image may have been altered to change the colour of the bird's brow from red to blue. The forensic photography expert could not conclusively determine the authenticity of the photograph without examining the original images, which Young claimed to have deleted. Some ornithologists posited that the image actually depicted double-eyed fig parrot whose brow colour had been altered. Young maintained that he did not alter the bird's colours, stating that he only lightened or darkened parts of the images. Writing on his website in February 2007, Young stated that a "body of evidence, including photographs of multiple birds, recordings and biological material together with a nest site" were forthcoming, however, no further evidence was produced, and the Queensland Government withdrew support for Young's claim. Allegations emerged in 2024 that Young had admitted to having known the whole time that the bird in his photo was not a new species, saying that he had been pressured into making the claim as a publicity stunt.

=== Night parrot controversy ===
In 2013, Young reported that he had sighted and photographed the night parrot, an endangered Australian bird. Live night parrots had not been definitively documented since 1912, though two dead ones were found in 1991 and 2006. However, the appearance of mesh in one of Young's photos raised questions as to how he was able to get pictures and videos of such a secretive bird. Young denied that he captured the individual, which would have been illegal.

In 2016, Young was hired as a senior biologist for the Australian Wildlife Conservancy (AWC). He resigned from his position in September 2018.

In 2019, the Australian Wildlife Conservancy published a report determining that some of Young's supposed observations were not credible. They determined that night parrot calls recorded by Young at Kalamurina Sanctuary were the result of playing publicly available call files near the detector rather than calls from an actual bird. Experts determined that an alleged night parrot nest photographed by Young contained fake eggs made of plaster or clay.

As a result of their report, the AWC also retracted Young's findings related to the buff-breasted buttonquail, another endangered Australian bird.

== Arrest and Imprisonment ==
In August 2023, Young failed to appear at a court in Queensland to answer for four charges of child sex abuse, and was subsequently reported to have gone missing. He was later discovered to have been hiding in the rainforest of the Cape York Peninsula, where he was arrested in September 2024 at Lockhart River after evading police for more than a year. In May 2025 he pleaded guilty to two of the four charges, involving offenses perpetrated in 2018, and was sentenced to two years in prison.

== Documentaries ==
- Ghosts of the Forest (2001)
- The Kingfishers (2004)
- John Young and the search for the red goshawk (2004)
- Kingdom of the Jabiru (2004)
- Rainforest: a musical journey through an Australian rainforest (2004)
- Owls (2004)
- Birds of Prey Part 1 (2005)
- Birds of Prey Part 2 (2006)
- Shadows in the desert: unearthing the secrets of the desert (2006)
- Wings of silence (2006)
