= Orange-breasted fig parrot =

The orange-breasted fig parrot has been split into three species:

- Blue-fronted fig parrot, Cyclopsitta gulielmitertii
- Black-fronted fig parrot, Cyclopsitta nigrifrons
- Dusky-cheeked fig parrot, Cyclopsitta melanogenia
