= Blue-browed fig parrot =

Species of bird

The blue-browed fig parrot, also referred to as the blue-fronted fig parrot, is a putative undescribed fig parrot said to inhabit the rugged rainforest-covered border ranges of subtropical south-eastern Queensland and north-eastern New South Wales, Australia. It was announced in November 2006 as the discovery of a new species or subspecies. However, the existence of the parrot has not been confirmed, and the claimed discovery is widely regarded to have been discredited, with allegations that it was a hoax.

== Background ==
Australia holds three fig parrot taxa, all of which are subspecies of the double-eyed fig parrot Cyclopsitta diophthalma, which is also found in New Guinea. Inhabiting the rainforest canopy, they are tiny (14 cm in length), mostly green in colour, with various red and blue markings on and around the face. The three distinct and geographically discrete Australian subspecies are:

- Marshall's fig parrot (C. d. marshalli), Cape York Peninsula, Queensland
- Macleay's fig parrot or red-browed fig parrot (C. d. macleayana), north-east Queensland
- Coxen's fig parrot (C. d. coxeni), border ranges of south-east Queensland and north-east New South Wales; it is rare, highly endangered and possibly extinct.

== Description ==
Examination of the only photograph of the new parrot that was made available shows that it closely resembles a Macleay's fig parrot, with the main difference being that the forehead is blue rather than red. The authenticity of the photograph is in doubt.

== History ==
=== Announcement ===
On 8 November 2006 it was reported prominently in the Brisbane Courier Mail that naturalist and cinematographer John Young had discovered a new fig parrot species in rugged forest country in southern Queensland after an exhaustive search. The exact site of the discovery was not disclosed, though Young claimed that he had known of the bird's existence for ten years. The range of the new parrot was said to overlap with that of Coxen's fig parrot. The Queensland Environment Minister Lindy Nelson-Carr said that the new fig parrot represented a fourth Australian fig parrot species or subspecies.

The first public announcement had been made by Young the previous evening, 7 November 2006, at O'Reilly's Guesthouse in the Lamington National Park to an audience of birdwatchers, as well as to Minister Nelson-Carr and to Dr Ian Gynther, a Senior Conservation Officer with the Queensland Parks and Wildlife Service. The audience was shown a photograph by Young of the new parrot and informed that it was the subject of a scientific paper being written by Young and Gynther for the journal Emu that would examine the relationship between the blue-fronted fig parrot and the three hitherto known Australian fig parrot taxa. However, even Gynther had not been informed of the precise discovery location.

It would later be reported that soon after the announcement, Young had led a small group including his friend, naturalist Lloyd Nielsen, as well as government scientists who had endorse the claim, to what he said was the bird's nest site, but that no sighting was made on the outing.

=== Doubts ===
Subsequently, questions were raised concerning Young's claim and the photograph of the new parrot that had been made available to the media. Ornithologists Penny Olsen and Richard Schodde expressed doubts, with Olsen finding the photograph unconvincing, and with Schodde saying that, until there was proper documentation and the claim confirmed by more than one independent qualified observer, the report should be disregarded. Schodde later said that the existence of two very closely related parrots living side by side in remnant patches of rainforest around the Queensland - New South Wales border was highly unlikely, concluding that, without further evidence such as DNA material, Young's claim should be treated with "utmost scepticism".

The photograph was examined by Gale Spring, an associate professor in scientific photography at Melbourne's RMIT University, and expert in forensic photography, who expressed strong doubts about it, saying that the surface imaging was typical of pictures that had been altered. An offer by Spring to examine other claimed photographs at the offices of Young's company, John Young Wildlife Enterprises (JYWE), was not taken up. After senior departmental officers saw a presentation by Spring on the only photographic evidence, the Queensland Government began to distance itself from Young, with its Environmental Protection Agency issuing a statement saying that, following the failure of JYWE to fulfil an undertaking to provide further photographs to Spring, it would "not be undertaking further investigations into Mr Young's claim" without further evidence. An undertaking by Young to provide pin feathers, said to have been plucked from fig parrot chicks, for DNA analysis was also not fulfilled.

In a 19 February 2007 media release by JYWE, it was stated that the parrot was difficult to find because its habitat lay above the high-altitude rainforest canopy. It also said that Young had collected a body of evidence, including recordings, photographs of several different birds, biological material and a nest site, which would, in due course, be made available to the scientific community. The release also expressed disappointment that “armchair experts” were prepared to question Young's integrity before he had had the chance to complete his fieldwork and have the evidence independently analysed prior to releasing all his information about the parrot to the community at large. The release ended with the statement that "It may take some considerable time for John to complete his work, but we have no doubt that when this happens it will prove a significant addition to our knowledge of Fig-Parrots".

A naturalist writing for The Australian speaking retrospectively on the incident in 2024 said that "Ornithological experts from a range of disciplines were unanimous in dismissing the claim", but that many nature lovers still believed Young's claim despite no further evidence having emerged.

=== Hoax Allegations ===
In February 2024, Greg Roberts, a naturalist and news reporter who had publicly doubted Young's assertions from the beginning reported in The Australian that Young had recently, in private "admitted that his claims of a new species were bogus". He had reportedly told Roberts and others that he believed his purported Blue-browed Fig Parrot photo actually depicted a Coxen's Fig Parrot, though Roberts questioned whether it was even that subspecies. Roberts reported that both Young and Lloyed Nielsen, a fellow naturalist and author who had defended Young, said Young had reluctantly mounted the hoax under pressure from commercial interests hoping to position Young as the "new Steve Irwin" in the aftermath of Irwin's death. An agent who had worked as a commercial advisor to Young at the time denied having suggested that Young claim the parrot was a new species. Young had by this time gained a reputation for making spurious claims about bird sightings.
