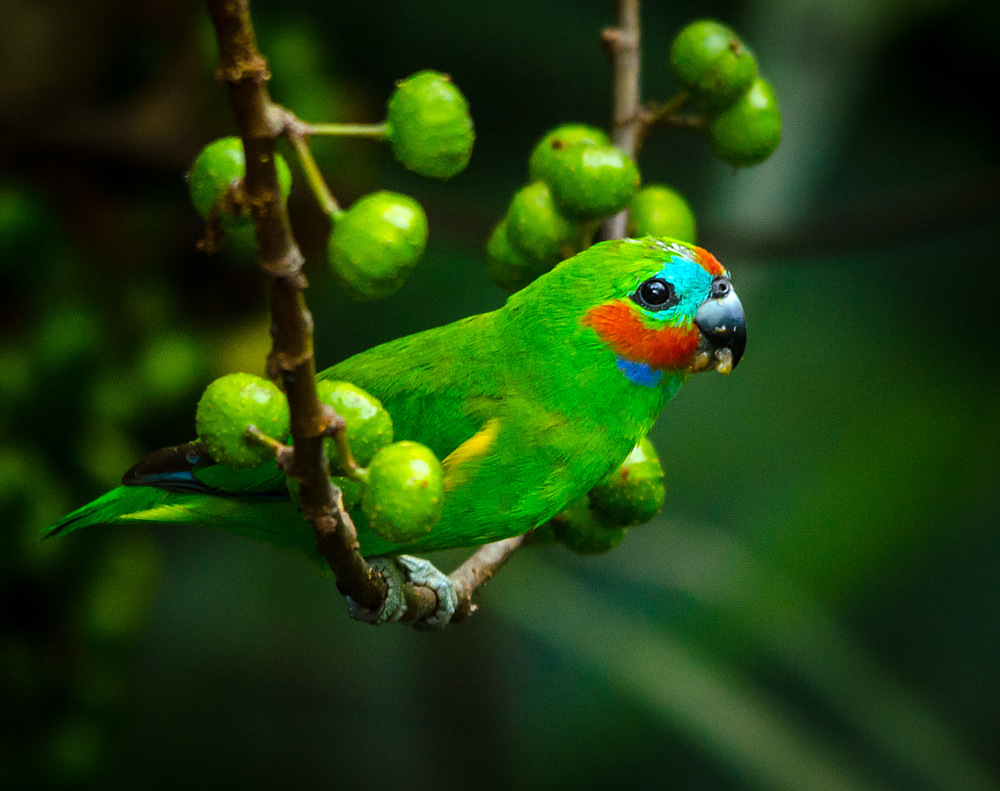
- A male red-browed fig parrot in Mossman Gorge, Daintree National Park, Queensland, Australia

Scientific classification
- Kingdom: Animalia
- Phylum: Chordata
- Class: Aves
- Order: Psittaciformes
- Family: Psittaculidae
- Genus: Cyclopsitta
- Species: C. diophthalma
- Subspecies: C. d. macleayana

Trinomial name
- Cyclopsitta diophthalma macleayana E. P. Ramsay, 1874

= Red-browed fig parrot =

Subspecies of bird

The red-browed fig parrot (Cyclopsitta diophthalma macleayana), also known as the Macleay's fig parrot, is one of three Australian subspecies of the double-eyed fig parrot (Cyclopsitta diophthalma). This subspecies is referred to as the red-browed fig parrot as it takes its name from the prominent red spot on its central forehead, resembling an eyebrow. The other Australian subspecies include Marshall’s fig parrot (C. d. marshalli), which is the most northern subspecies found on Cape York Peninsula (northern Queensland), and Coxen’s fig parrot (C. d. coxeni), with its current range often cited as the Border Ranges region (southern Queensland/northern New South Wales). The Macleay’s fig parrot is the smallest of all Australian parrots, recognized for its vivid plumage and specialized fig-based diet.

Populations have suffered due to the loss and degradation of their rainforest habitat, with the current wild population estimated at approximately 5,000 individuals. It is the only fig parrot subspecies currently maintained in captivity in Australia.

== Taxonomy ==
The red-browed fig parrot belongs to the family Psittaculidae and the genus Cyclopsitta. It is one of three subspecies of double-eyed fig parrot found in Australia. The three Australian subspecies are:

- Red-browed fig parrot (Cyclopsitta diophthalma macleayana).
- Marshall's fig parrot (Cyclopsitta diophthalma marshalli).
- Coxen's fig parrot (Cyclopsitta diophthalma coxeni).

Among the three Australian subspecies, C. d. macleayana is generally considered the most numerous, with the wild population estimated at approximately 5,000 birds. In contrast, the southernmost subspecies, Coxen's fig parrot (P. d. coxeni), is highly threatened. It is currently considered endangered under legislation and is listed as one of the seven most threatened birds in Australia. The red-browed fig parrot is approximately 20% smaller than Coxen’s fig parrot.

== Description ==
The red-browed fig parrot is the smallest of all Australian parrots, typically measuring 5 to 6 inches (13–15 cm) in length. Its weight varies from 25 to 56 grams, and its wingspan ranges from 10 to 11 inches (25–28 cm). Physically, the birds have a predominantly bright green body, featuring blue, red, and yellow facial markings. They have very short tails and a proportionally large head and bill relative to their body. Their wings are mainly green but are marked with small amounts of blue and yellow.

=== Sexual dimorphism ===
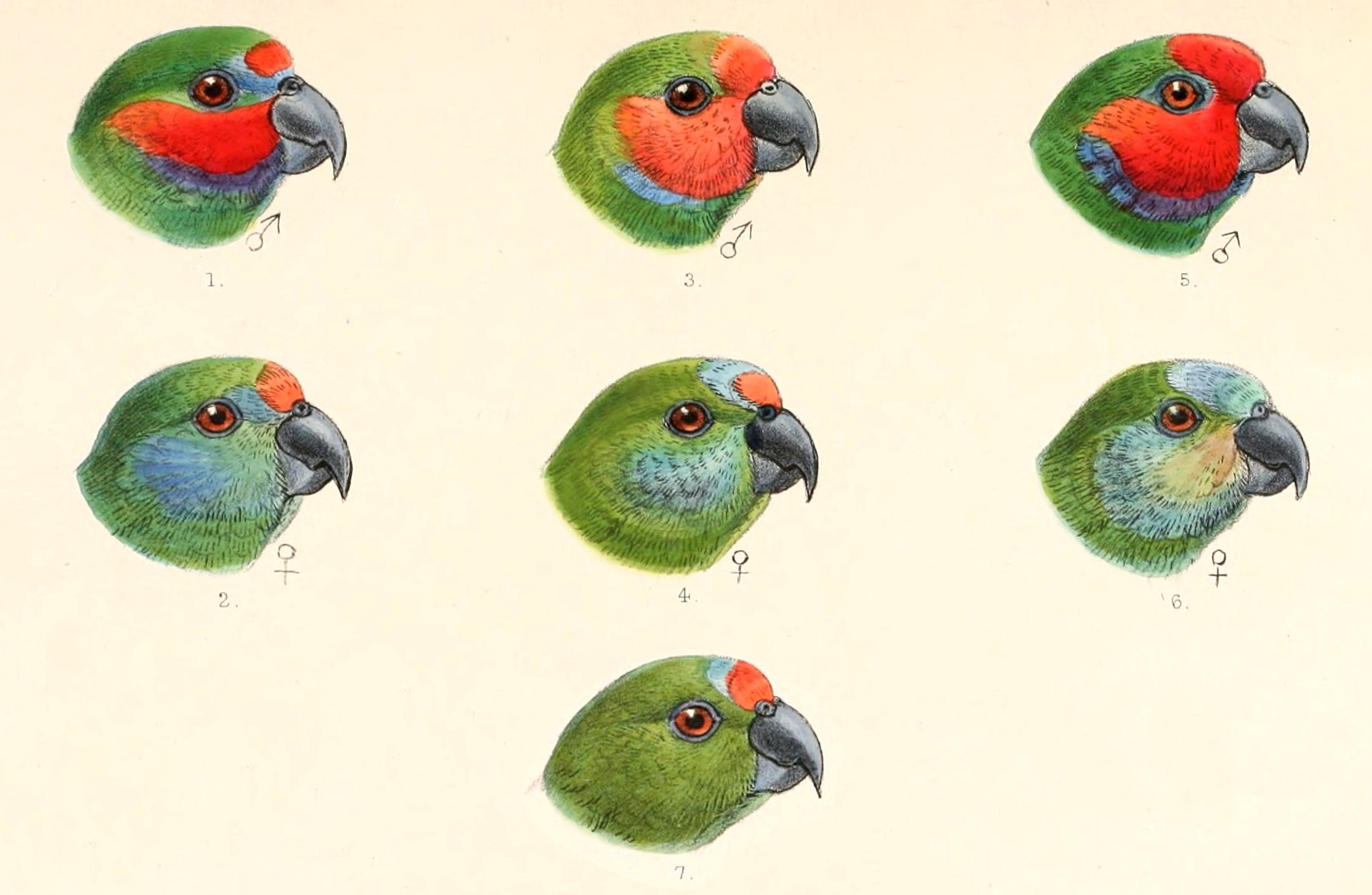
Heads of different subspecies of the double-eyed fig parrot (Cyclopsitta diophthalma): 1. Cyclopsitta diophthalma macleayana - male. 2. Cyclopsitta diophthalma macleayana - female 3. Cyclopsitta diophthalma virago - male 4. Cyclopsitta diophthalma virago - female 5. Cyclopsitta diophthalma aruensis - male 6. Cyclopsitta diophthalma aruensis - female 7. Cyclopsitta diophthalma inseparabilis

The species is sexually dimorphic, most clearly seen in the bright coloration around the cheeks and eyes. Males display vivid facial markings, with turquoise rings around their eyes and red and blue bands on their cheeks. They develop their characteristic red cheek patches at approximately one year of age. Males can reach sexual maturity as early as ten months, even before full facial coloration appears, making them resemble juveniles. Females have turquoise eye rings but have silver feathers adorning their cheeks instead of red, resulting in more muted facial hues.

== Habitat and distribution ==
The red-browed fig parrot occurs in the coastal rainforest of north Queensland and is found within the Wet Tropics rainforest or adjacent open woodland. Although largely forest-dwelling, it can sometimes be seen in parks and gardens where suitable fig trees grow. Its distribution extends from near Cooktown south to Cardwell, and possibly as far as Townsville and Paluma, Queensland. These parrots are non-migratory outside of Australia but may move seasonally within their range, shifting north or inland following fruit availability.

== Behavior ==
The red-browed fig parrot exhibits distinctive behaviors related to flight, feeding, and particularly nesting. It is described as a voracious chewer, using its strong bill to break open wood and fruit. In captivity, access to branches or suitable chewable material is essential because, if not provided, overgrowth of the beak can occur. The birds can rapidly build up speed in flight. Because of this, aviaries should include brush barriers to reduce collision risk. They are typically observed in pairs or small groups.

=== Vocalizations ===
These parrots typically emit a soft, metallic “tzeet-tzeet” call when flying, just before take-off, or during social interactions. Conversely, they remain mostly silent while feeding. Calls serve as contact signals between mates or among small groups in flight.

=== Diet ===
Red-browed fig parrots often feed in pairs or small groups. Their diet primarily consists of figs (Ficus spp.), but also includes berries, seeds, nectar, and insect larvae that bore into wood. Commonly consumed fig species include the Port Jackson fig (Ficus rubiginosa), Moreton Bay fig (Ficus macrophylla), small-leaved fig (Ficus obiiquu) and sandpaper fig (Ficus coronata).

=== Reproduction ===
Red-browed fig parrots are monogamous.

==== Nesting ====
Unlike most parrots, red-browed fig parrots have a unique habit among Australian species for their ability to excavate their own nest hollows by completely digging out the entrance and chamber in soft or rotten wood. In the wild, they usually nest in dead branches. Observations suggest that females perform much, if not all, of the excavation of the nest-hole in both captive and wild parrots, while the male may act as a sentry or guard. In captivity, although complete excavation is not required for breeding, a thick layer of substrate should be provided for digging behavior. One report noted a Macleay’s fig parrot attempting to excavate a hole in a live Coconut Palm trunk in June.

==== Breeding cycle ====
In the wild, breeding occurs between March and June, with egg-laying generally taking place from August to September. Captive breeding has been recorded from July to January. Clutches usually contain two or three eggs, laid with a 24–48-hour interval between them. Eggs are white, rounded, and without gloss, measuring about 20-22 x 17-18mm.

Incubation lasts 18 to 24 days, and fledging occurs at 36–42 days late in the year. Newly hatched chicks weigh 2.3–3.5 g and reach 35–40 g by fledging. The chicks normally open their eyes by day 6 and begin feathering by day 20. After about a month, males feed the young. Fledglings leave the nest at around five weeks and become independent 7–10 days later.

Pairs commonly produce two clutches per season, though one captive pair produced three. The inter-clutch interval has been recorded at 17–18 days. Red-browed fig parrots may reach maturity as early as 10 months and have a lifespan of at least 15 years, with breeding recorded up to eight years of age.

== Threats and survival ==
The red-browed fig parrot has been negatively affected by habitat loss and fragmentation through deforestation, agriculture, and urban development. Climate change may further threaten fig tree availability, a critical food source.

In captive management, adult females require extra calcium and vitamin D supplements to prevent egg binding, and some chicks have been observed with partial brain formation defects. Health issues in captive populations include chlamydia infections (linked to low breeding success), bacterial enteritis, septicemia, pneumonia, rickets, egg-yolk infections, and liver infection.

== Relationship to humans ==
The red-browed fig parrot is the only fig parrot species maintained in captivity in Australia. It can occasionally be seen in human-inhabited areas where fig trees are present. Injured or orphaned birds that cannot be released are occasionally kept in care facilities.

A captive-breeding program for C. d. macleayana was established at Currumbin Wildlife Sanctuary in 1987.

== Conservation status ==
According to the Nature Conservation (Animals/Plants) Regulation 2020, the red-browed fig parrot (Cyclopsitta diophthalma macleayana) is currently listed as "least concern" in Queensland (as of 6 June 2025). It was previously classified as "vulnerable" under the same regulation until that date. Nationally, the subspecies is also listed as "least concern" under the Action Plan for Australian Birds (2000), and the IUCN Red List of Threatened Species (2009).
