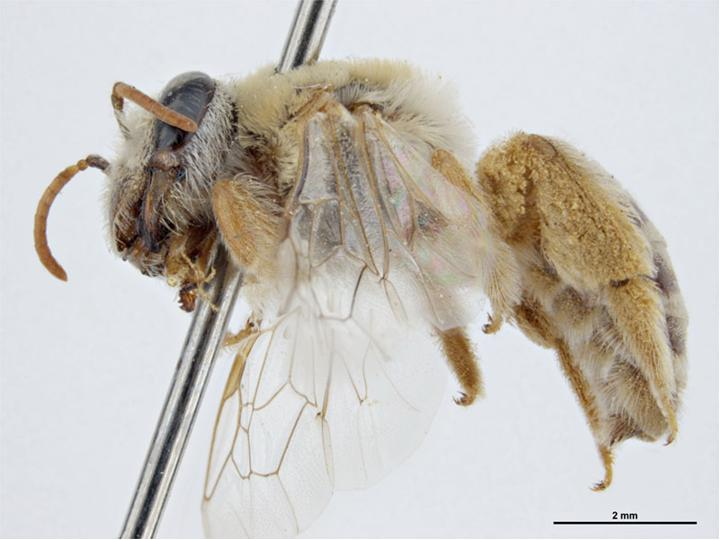
- Female

Scientific classification
- Kingdom: Animalia
- Phylum: Arthropoda
- Clade: Pancrustacea
- Class: Insecta
- Order: Hymenoptera
- Family: Colletidae
- Genus: Leioproctus
- Species: L. gallipes

Binomial name
- Leioproctus gallipes (Cockerell, 1913)

Synonyms
- Paracolletes gallipes Cockerell, 1913

= Leioproctus gallipes =

Species of bee

Leioproctus gallipes, or Leioproctus (Goniocolletes) gallipes, is a species of bee in the family Colletidae and subfamily Colletinae. It is endemic to Australia. It was described by British-American entomologist Theodore Dru Alison Cockerell in 1913.

== Description ==
Female body length is about 11 mm. Colouration is mainly black and rust-red.

== Distribution and habitat ==
The species occurs in arid north-eastern South Australia. The type locality is Poonarunna, on the northern fringes of Lake Eyre.

== Behaviour ==
The adults are flying mellivores.

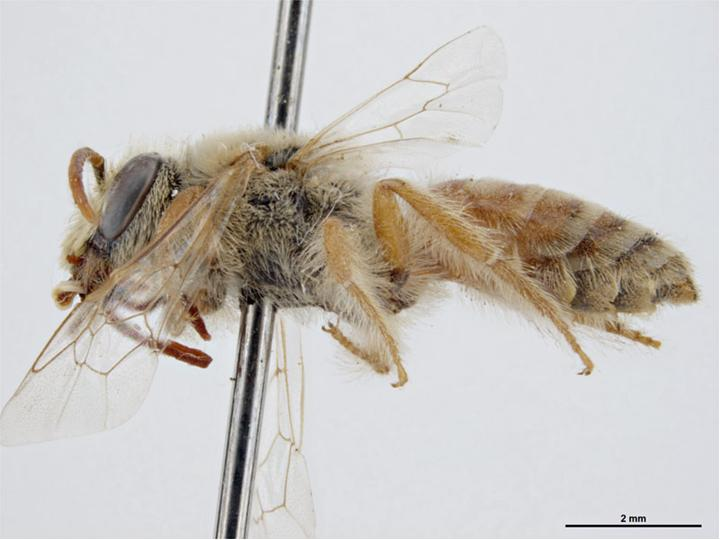
Male
