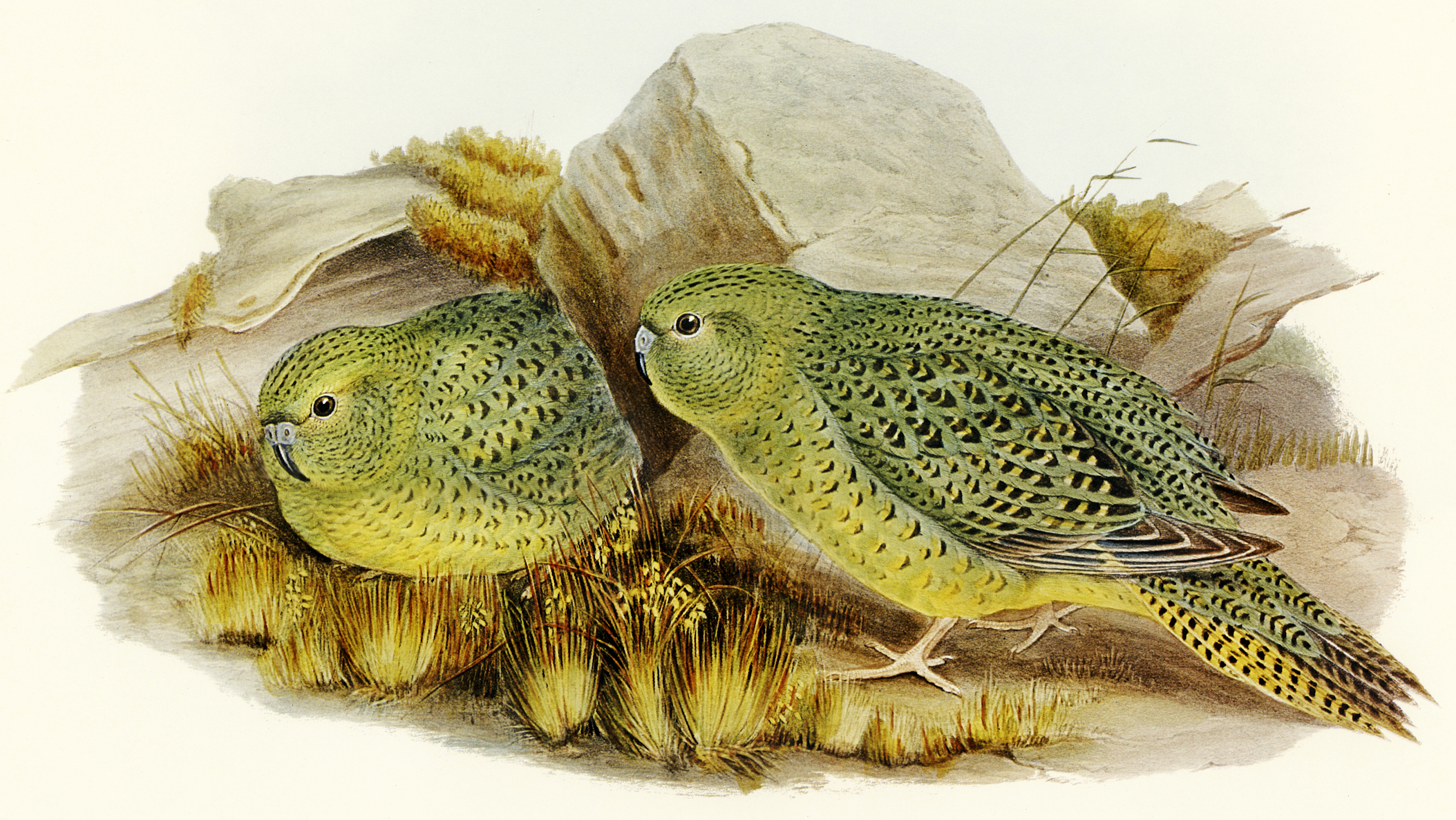
- Illustration from 1890 by Elizabeth Gould

Conservation status
- Critically Endangered (IUCN 3.1)
- CITES Appendix I

Scientific classification
- Kingdom: Animalia
- Phylum: Chordata
- Class: Aves
- Order: Psittaciformes
- Family: Psittaculidae
- Genus: Pezoporus
- Species: P. occidentalis

Binomial name
- Pezoporus occidentalis (Gould, 1861)
- Historical (light red) and recent sightings with year (red dots)

Synonyms
- Geopsittacus occidentalis

= Night parrot =

Endangered Australian species of bird

The night parrot (Pezoporus occidentalis) is a small parrot endemic to the continent of Australia. It has also been known as porcupine parrot, nocturnal ground parakeet, midnight cockatoo, solitaire, spinifex parrot and night parakeet. It is one of the most elusive and mysterious birds in the world, with no confirmed sightings of the bird between 1912 and 1979, leading to speculation that it was extinct. Sightings since 1979 have been extremely rare and the bird's population size is unknown, though based on the paucity of records it is thought to number between 50 and 249 mature individuals, and it is classified by the IUCN as a critically endangered species.

A few sightings or recordings of its presence, with varying degrees of certainty, have occurred in the Pilbara region of Western Australia, south-western Queensland, the Lake Eyre basin in South Australia and the Northern Territory. However, some of the evidence produced by wildlife photographer John Young has been called into question, and in March 2019 the Australian Wildlife Conservancy (AWC) retracted some of the records created by Young and published by the AWC.

== Taxonomy ==
Ornithologist John Gould described the night parrot in 1861, from a specimen—the holotype—that was collected 13 km southeast of Mt Farmer, west of Lake Austin in Western Australia. Its specific epithet is Latin occidentalis "western". The species was originally placed within its own genus (Geopsittacus) by Gould, though consensus soon swung in favour of placing it in Pezoporus; James Murie dissected a specimen, observing that it was very similar in anatomy and plumage to the ground parrot. Gould had posited a relationship to the kākāpō based on similarity of the plumage, however Murie concluded they were markedly different anatomically. Despite its close relationship with the ground parrot, its placement in the genus Pezoporus was uncertain, with some authorities leaving it in its own genus, as data on the night parrot was so limited. A 1994 molecular study using the cytochrome b of several parrot species confirmed the close relationship of the taxa and consensus for its placement in Pezoporus. It also revealed that the kākāpō was not closely related to Pezoporus. Analysis of mitochondrial and nuclear DNA sequences in a 2011 study showed that the night parrot most likely diverged from the ancestor of the eastern and western ground parrots around 3.3 million years ago.

Alternative common names include porcupine parrot, nocturnal ground parakeet, midnight cockatoo, solitaire, spinifex parrot and night parakeet.

== Description ==
A relatively small and short-tailed parrot, the species' colour is predominantly a yellowish green, mottled with dark brown, blacks and yellows. Both sexes have this coloration. It is distinguished from the two superficially similar ground parrot species by its shorter tail and different range and habitat. Predominantly terrestrial, taking to the air only when panicked or in search of water, the night parrot has furtive, nocturnal habits and—even when it was abundant—was apparently a highly secretive species. Its natural habitat appears to be the spinifex grass which still dominates much of the dry, dusty Australian interior; other early reports also indicate that it never strayed far from water. It may also inhabit chenopod shrublands, eucalyptus woodlands, and mallee shrublands. One of the vocalisations of the night parrot has been described as a croak and identified as a contact call. Other calls, mostly short "ding-ding" whistles, and a more drawn out whistle, have been recorded from Queensland and Western Australia.

== Diet ==
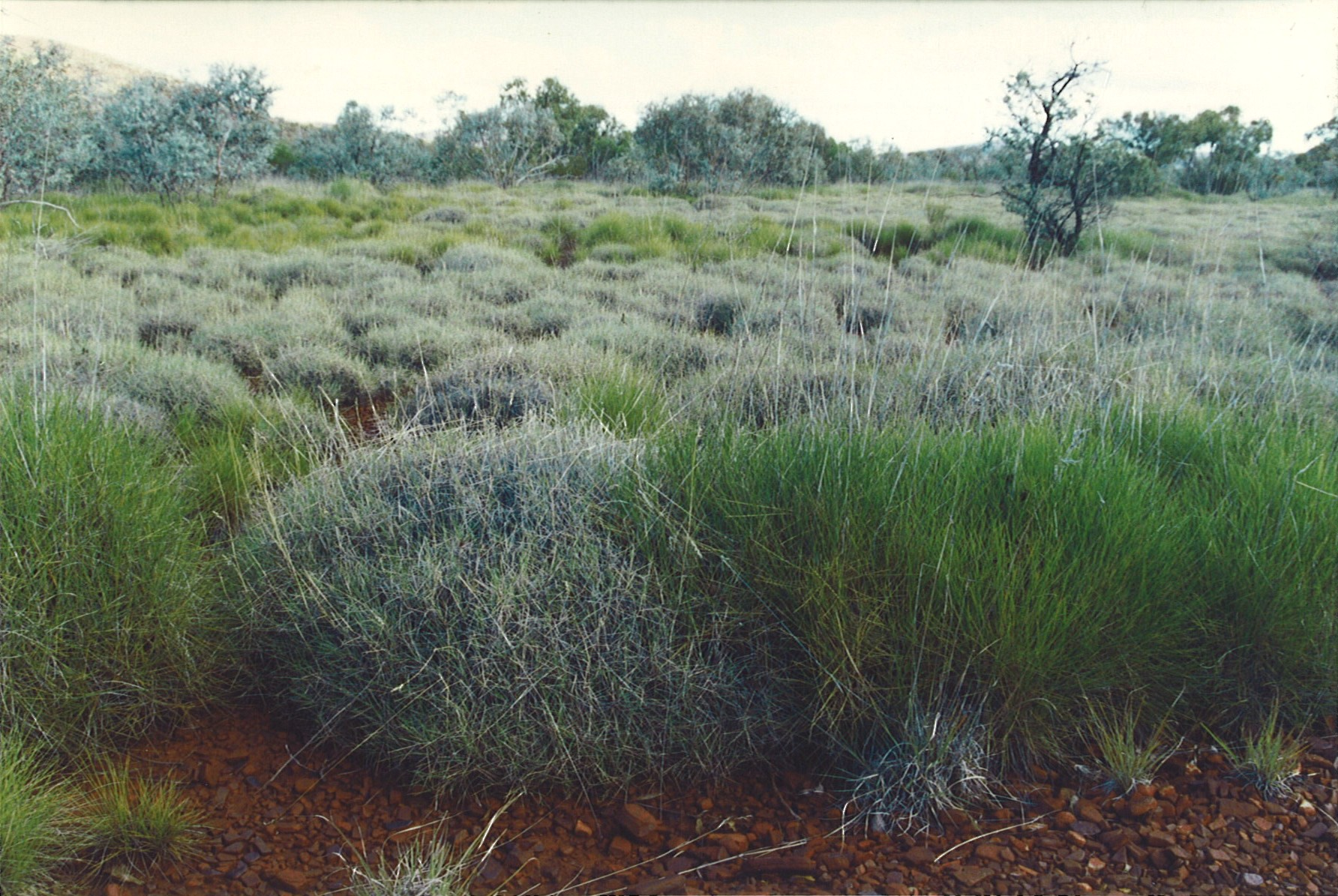
Triodia grass

Historic sources indicate that the night parrot eats seeds of grasses (especially Enneapogon purpurascens and Triodia) and herbs.

== Conservation status ==
The population size of this species is not known, but assumed to be continuing to decline. As of July 2022, it is listed on the IUCN Red List as Critically endangered. According to the IUCN Red List the night parrot has a population of 40–500, or possibly larger. It is listed as Endangered under the Environment Protection and Biodiversity Conservation Act 1999 by the Australian government.

=== Important Bird Areas ===
Sites identified by BirdLife International as being important for night parrot conservation are the Diamantina and Astrebla Grasslands of western Queensland, and the Fortescue Marshes of the Pilbara.

== Sightings ==
The night parrot remains one of the world's most elusive and mysterious birds. Reliable records of the species have been few and far between, with efforts to locate it proving fruitless after an authenticated report in 1912.

Local reports of sightings continued regularly over the following century, but for many decades none were accompanied by enough evidence for skeptics to conclude that they were reliable. In 1979, ornithologist Shane Parker from the South Australian Museum spotted an apparent flock of the birds in the far north of South Australia. A roadkill specimen was discovered in 1990 by scientists returning from an expedition in a remote part of Queensland.

=== 21st-century sightings ===
==== April 2005: Minga Well sighting ====
Three individuals seen near Minga Well, Pilbara region of Western Australia and near the Fortescue Marshes.

The approval of the A$2 billion Cloud Break mine project through the then–Minister for the Environment, Ian Campbell, was criticised because of a number of endangered species in the area of the future mine, among them the night parrot. In order to gain EPA approval, the mine had to implement a management plan to ensure that mining activities would not have a negative effect on the species survival in the area. The occurrence of the night parrot in the future mining area, at Minga Well on 12 April 2005, was discovered during a 2005 survey commissioned by FMG, which was carried out by two contract biologists, Robert Davis and Brendan Metcalf, who sighted a small group of the birds. Unconfirmed sightings of the bird had been made previously in a nearby area in 2004.

The sighting was at dusk, and Davis and Metcalf were not able to obtain a photograph of the three birds they saw, but are confident that they spotted three night parrots. The detailed descriptions of their sighting were accepted by the Birds Australia Rarities Committee (BARC), making it the first accepted night parrot sighting in modern times. Based on this acceptance by scientific peers, a paper describing the sighting was published in the Australian ornithological journal, Emu, in 2008. The two biologists carried out further searches at Minga Well and Moojari Well the following five nights after the sighting, but were unable to see the birds again. A follow-up survey of the Fortescue Marsh area in May 2005 was unsuccessful in finding any conclusive evidence of the species.

==== September 2006: Dead individual ====
Dead female, flown into a barbed wire fence in Diamantina National Park in south western Queensland.

Following up on this record, John Young said he heard a pair from close range in April 2007.

==== May 2013: John Young's photograph ====
In May 2013 naturalist and wildlife cinematographer John Young, who had previously been accused of falsifying the discovery of the purported blue-browed fig parrot, claimed to have taken the first ever photographs and video footage of a living night parrot. Young said that he had captured the images and 17-second video after seventeen thousand hours in the field over 15 years of searching. He revealed his results during an invitation-only press conference on 3 July 2013, but kept the exact range in Queensland where he had observed this individual secret. It was later revealed to be the area now known as Pullen Pullen Reserve.

Though subsequent records from Young would eventually be discredited, his 2013 photo would continue to be accepted as real even by his critics. However, some colleagues held suspicions that Young may have illegally captured the bird in order to photograph it. This grew into a major controversy after an uncropped version of the photo was published in Audubon magazine in 2018, appearing to reveal a cage-like mesh in one corner. The accusation was supported by a prominent book, Night Parrot: Australia’s most elusive bird by Penny Olsen, which had gone to press prior to the Audubon article. Young had previously denied having captured the bird, and his version of the story was supported by an associate who had reportedly been with him at the time the photo was taken.

Young also provided five feathers in 2013 from a purported roost site in the Lake Eyre basin to the Western Australian Museum's Molecular Systematics Unit, where DNA analysis conclusively matched the feathers to DNA samples of dead Pezoporus occidentalis birds.

==== April 2015: Live individual capture ====
Live night parrot held by ornithologist Steve Murphy

On 4 April 2015, ornithologist Steve Murphy and partner Rachel Barr captured and radio tagged a live individual, whom they nicknamed "Pedro", in southwestern Queensland. Photographs of the bird in Murphy's hand were released to Australian media on 10 August 2015, while keeping the precise location secret. A conservation reserve covering some 56,000 hectares has been created in the area to protect the species.

Sean Dooley of Birdlife: The Magazine described the find as, "The bird watching equivalent of finding Elvis flipping burgers in an outback roadhouse". South Australian Museum collection manager Philippa Horton called the find, "One of the holy grails, one of the world's rarest species probably".

==== 2016–2021 ====
- 2016: Nicholas Leseberg, PhD student at the University of Queensland, photographed a fledgling in 2016 in the Pullen Pullen Reserve in Western Queensland.
- January 2017: Whistle call attributed to night parrot recorded in southern Northern Territory by zoologist Chris Watson and colleague Mark Carter.
- March 2017: Photograph of a living specimen in Western Australia, seen by four birders from Broome.
- February 2018: Image of a young bird, aged 3 to 5 months old, is recorded by Nicholas Leseberg, in Pullen Pullen Reserve.
- June 2017 – April 2018: Targeted environmental survey confirms the presence of night parrots around Kumpupintil Lake in Western Australia.
- November 2018: Second known photo captured in the Great Sandy Desert in the Kimberley region of Western Australia by Indigenous rangers, the Indigenous Desert Lions.
- August 2020: Indigenous rangers of the Martu people and University of Queensland record night parrot sounds in the Pilbara desert, around salt lakes - the fifth confirmed location in Western Australia.
- August 2021: The Martu Rangers capture the fourth confirmed photograph of the parrot in flight in a remote region of Western Australia.

=== 2016-2018 disputed records ===
Subsequent to John Young's 2013 photo of the bird, he claimed to have found the species several more times:

- 2016: Young announces he has found night parrots in Diamantina National Park, adjacent to the Pullen Pullen nature reserve. Seven sightings are recorded, including a pair and three active nests with eggs.
- September 2016: Camera trap records what appears to be a night parrot on property owned by the AWC, Kalamurina Station in the northern Lake Eyre region, SA, but the photo is not clear.
- July 2017: Single night parrot feather found in a finch nest on the Kalamurina property, by John Young and Keith Bellchambers from the Australian Wildlife Conservancy.
- September 2018: Recording of a night parrot call, downloaded from an acoustic monitor at Kalamurina.

In October 2018, Australian Wildlife Conservancy (AWC) commenced an investigation into accusations that some records by Young, who was working at the organization at the time, might be spurious. This coincided with public controversy over accusations that he had secretly and illegally held a night parrot captive in order to procure his 2013 photograph. Young resigned from the AWC in September 2018, and the AWC removed all information about the night parrot from its website.

In March 2019, Young's reports were found to have issues relating to robustness of much of his work done in Queensland and South Australia, labelled as unscientific, deceptive and damaging to the AWC. In 2019, the AWC retracted its reports based on work done by Young. A panel of experts had looked at the nest and eggs found at Diamantina (2016); the feather found at Kalamurina (2017); and the recording of the call (2018). They found that each one had separate issues and none could be said to provide robust evidence of the parrot's presence.

=== 2024: A stronghold of up to 50 individuals ===
In September 2024, a team of Ngururrpa rangers and scientists announced in the CSIRO publication, Wildlife Research, that they had detected a stronghold of up to 50 night parrots, the largest known population of the species, living on the Ngururrpa Indigenous Protected Area, Great Sandy Desert, in Western Australia. The rangers also found a breeding area for the first time, and saw nests, eggs and feathers. The authors of the announcement suggested that the remnant population may have survived due to the presence of cat-eating dingoes.

Commenting on the announcement, a report published by ABC News observed that a sulphate of potash mine proposed for nearby Lake Mackay, and supported by local Aboriginal communities, might present environmental challenges to the newly detected night parrot population. However, the report also noted that Agrimin, the promoter of the proposed mine, was planning conservation measures including fire management, a control program for feral cats and red foxes (but not dingoes), and, perhaps most importantly, a curfew on haulage over the private road that would serve the proposed mine.

=== 2026: Confirmed sighting of a chick in WA desert and a new population in south-west Queensland? ===
Audio recordings taken in south-west Queensland suggest that another population of night parrots may be in the area. Although the location was not disclosed, it was described as being more than 150 kilometres (93 mi) from the other Queensland population at Pullen Pullen Reserve.

There was a discovery of a young night parrot in the middle of the Great Sandy Desert in Western Australia by members of the Ngururrpa Rangers and researchers. Daytime video footage captures the emotional response of the ranger team as they discover the nestling in a spinifex tunnel.

== In the arts ==
Dorothy Porter published a book of poetry titled The Night Parrot in 1984. Western Australian poet John Kinsella published a collection of his poems titled Night Parrots in 1989, which included a poem of the same title. In an essay written in 2005, Kinsella wrote "I share with the poet Dorothy Porter an interest in the rare or extinct night parrot, which is (or was) not a particularly colourful parrot. Its sublimity is in its discretion, its vulnerability, its solitude".

Adelaide writer Stephen Orr's 2026 novel, based on a story of father and son Pastor Carl Strehlow and anthropologist Ted Strehlow, is titled The Night Parrots. According to reviewer Ben Adams, Orr uses the parrot as a metaphor, "symbolising the power of belief in fragile, perhaps imagined things which can nevertheless allow people 'to feel secure'."
