= Hartert's double-eyed fig parrot =

Scientific classification
- Kingdom: Animalia
- Phylum: Chordata
- Class: Aves
- Order: Psittaciformes
- Family: Psittaculidae
- Genus: Cyclopsitta
- Species: C. diophthalma
- Subspecies: C. d. virago

Trinomial name
- Cyclopsitta diophthalma virago (Hartert, 1895)

Subspecies of bird

Hartert's double-eyed fig parrot (Cyclopsitta diophthalma virago) is a subspecies of the double-eyed fig parrot. It is native to the Fergusson and Goodenough islands (D'Entrecasteaux Islands, Papua New Guinea).

== Description ==
It has a dark green back and light green body. The male has red facial markings while the female has a red and blue cap.
