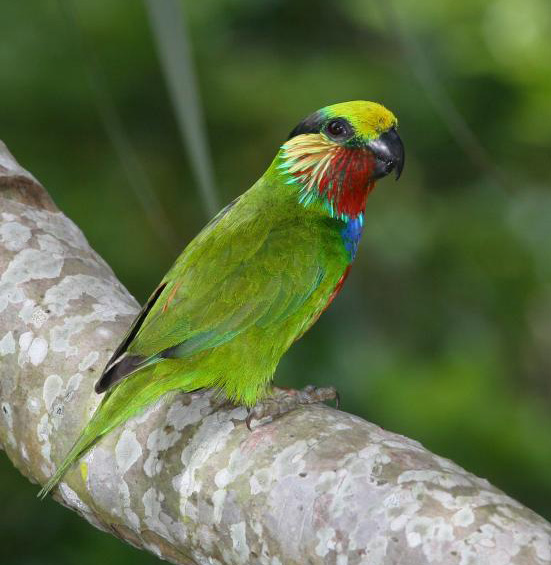

Conservation status
- Least Concern (IUCN 3.1)

Scientific classification
- Kingdom: Animalia
- Phylum: Chordata
- Class: Aves
- Order: Psittaciformes
- Family: Psittaculidae
- Genus: Cyclopsitta
- Species: C. edwardsii

Binomial name
- Cyclopsitta edwardsii (Oustalet, 1885)

Synonyms
- Psittaculirostris edwardsii

= Edwards's fig parrot =

Species of bird

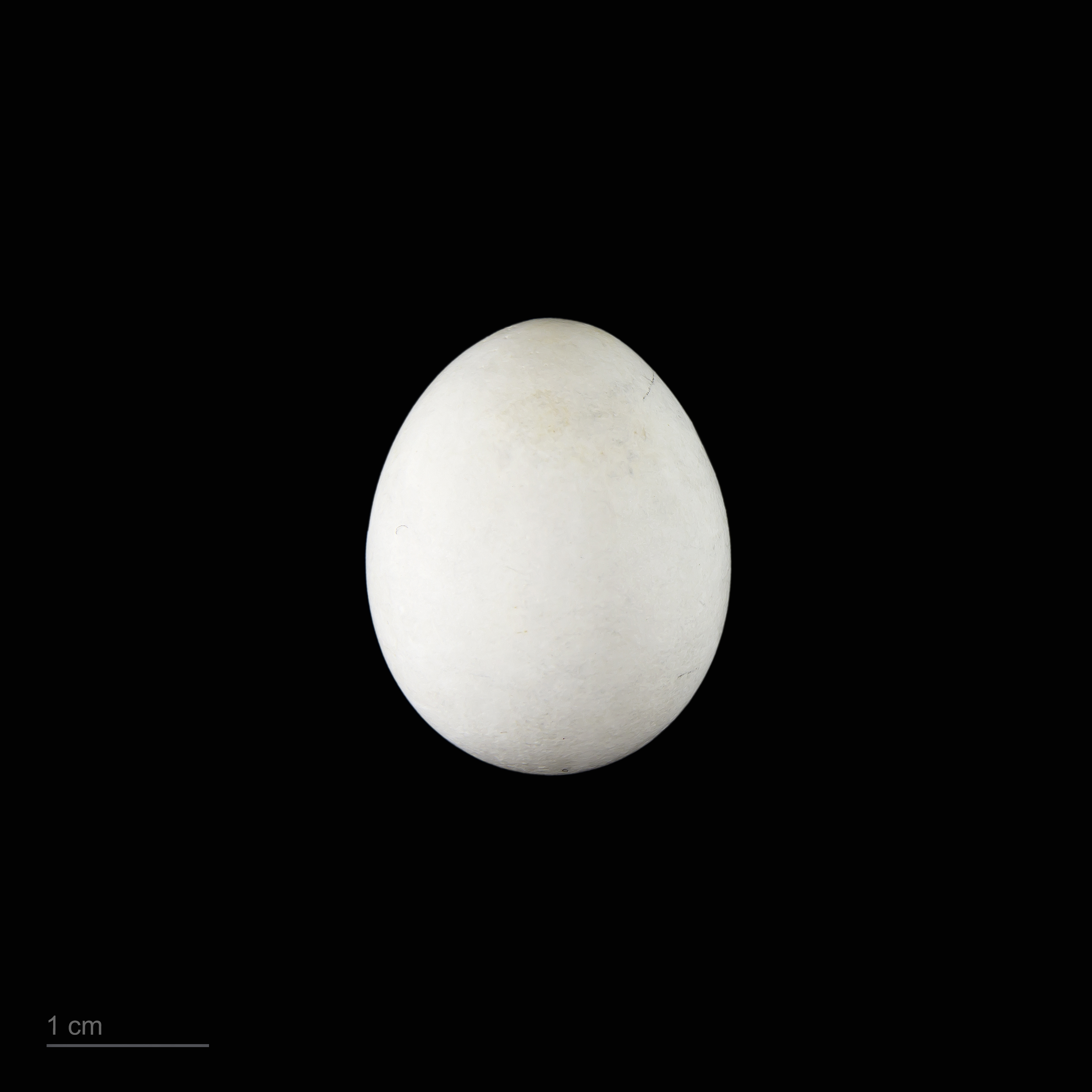
Psittaculirostris edwardsii - MHNT

Edwards's fig parrot (Cyclopsitta edwardsii), also known as the scarlet-cheeked fig parrot, is a species of parrot in the family Psittaculidae found in humid lowland forests in north-eastern New Guinea. The adult male is predominantly green with red breast and cheeks, yellow ear coverts, and yellowish crown.

== Taxonomy ==
Edwards's fig parrot was first described by French zoologist Émile Oustalet in 1885, and named in honour of French naturalist Alphonse Milne-Edwards. It is one of four fig parrots in the genus Cyclopsitta. It is monotypic: no subspecies are recognised.

== Description ==
A medium-sized parrot with a stocky build and short tail, it measures 18 cm (7.1 in) in length. The adult male has bright green wings, back, and tail. The feathers of the cheeks and ear coverts are long and narrow, giving the face a ruffed appearance. The cheek feathers are red and the ear coverts golden-yellow. The throat and breast are red with a dark blue-black band on the upper breast. The bill is a dark grey-black and the eye (iris) red. The feet are dark grey. The adult female is similar, but has a wider blue-black band on the otherwise green-yellow breast. Immature birds resemble the female.

Calls include a high-pitched screett or zseet, and a short sharp ks, described as "coins dropping on concrete".

== Distribution and habitat ==
Edwards's fig parrot is restricted to northeastern New Guinea, where it is found from Yos Sudarso Bay and Vanimo east to the Huon Gulf. Common within its range, it is found in lowland forests and cleared areas.

== Behaviour ==
Birds are found in ones or twos, although groups of up to 35 individuals may gather at fruit trees. Their predominantly green plumage makes them hard to spot against foliage. They have been recorded feeding with double-eyed fig parrots, fruit pigeons (Ptilinopus), honeyeaters, and starlings. They consume fruit including figs. Nesting takes place in small hollows high up in large trees, although little is known about this aspect of their behaviour.
