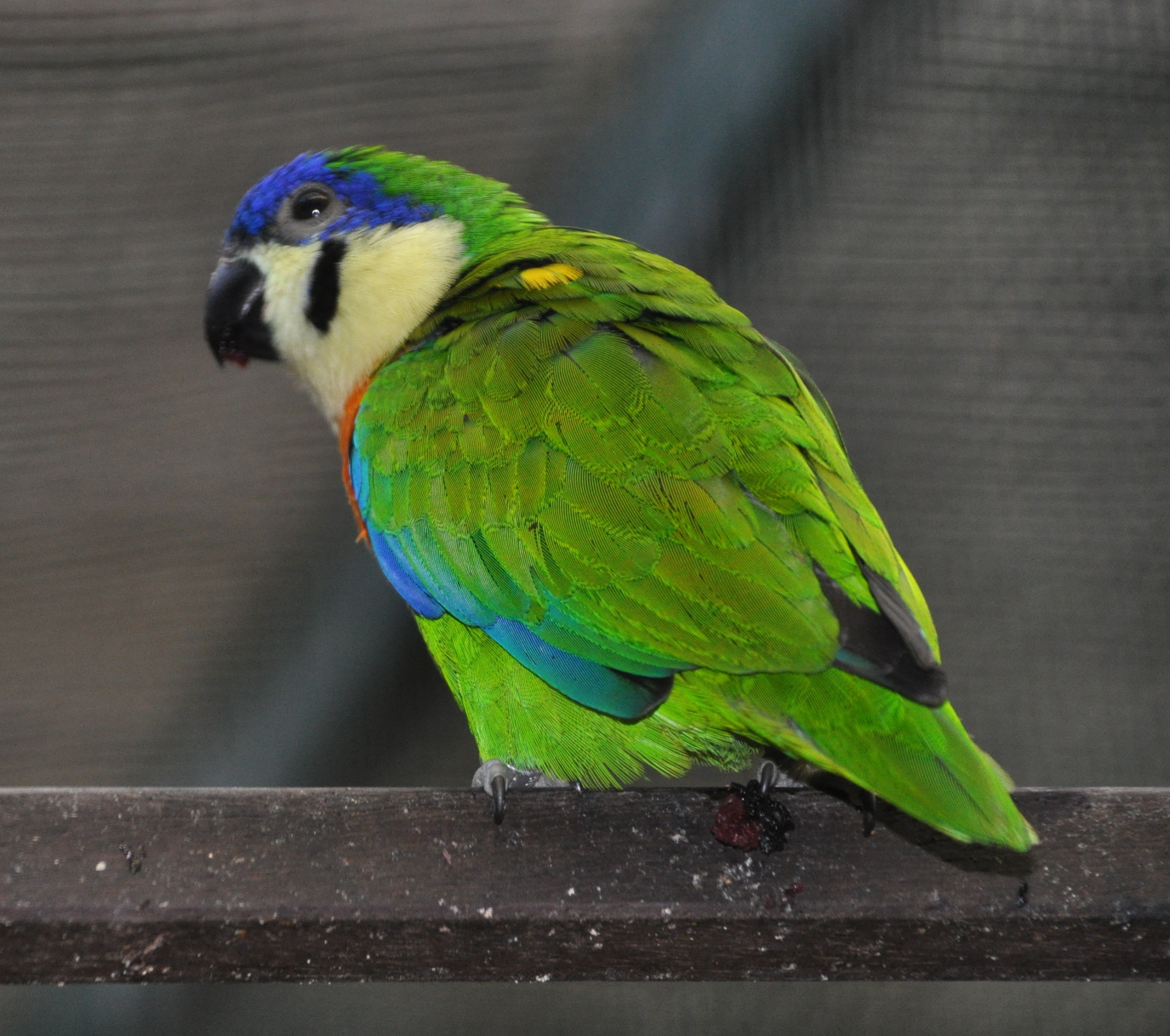
- Blue-fronted fig parrot (Nannopsittacus gulielmitertii)

Scientific classification
- Kingdom: Animalia
- Phylum: Chordata
- Class: Aves
- Order: Psittaciformes
- Family: Psittaculidae
- Subfamily: Loriinae
- Tribe: Cyclopsittini
- Genus: Nannopsittacus; Mathews, 1916

Type species
- Cyclopsitta suavissima Salvadori, 1876

= Nannopsittacus =

Genus of birds

Nannopsittacus is a genus of fig parrots in the family Psittaculidae. The three species are native to the island of New Guinea. There are also fig parrots in the genus Cyclopsitta.

== Taxonomy ==
The genus Nannopsittacus was introduced in 1916 by the Australian-born ornithologist Gregory Mathews with Cyclopsitta suavissima Salvadori, 1876, as the type species. This taxon is now considered to be a subspecies of the dusky-cheeked fig parrot (Nannopsittacus melanogenia suavissimus). The genus name combines the Ancient Greek ναννος/nannos meaning "dwarf" with ψιττακος/psittakos meaning "parrot".

The genus contains three species:

Image	Common name	Scientific name	Distribution
	Dusky-cheeked fig parrot	Nannopsittacus melanogenia	Aru Islands and south New Guinea
	Blue-fronted fig parrot	Nannopsittacus gulielmitertii	western New Guinea (western Bird s Head Peninsula), including Salawati (Raja Ampat Islands, off western New Guinea)
	Black-fronted fig parrot	Nannopsittacus nigrifrons	north New Guinea
