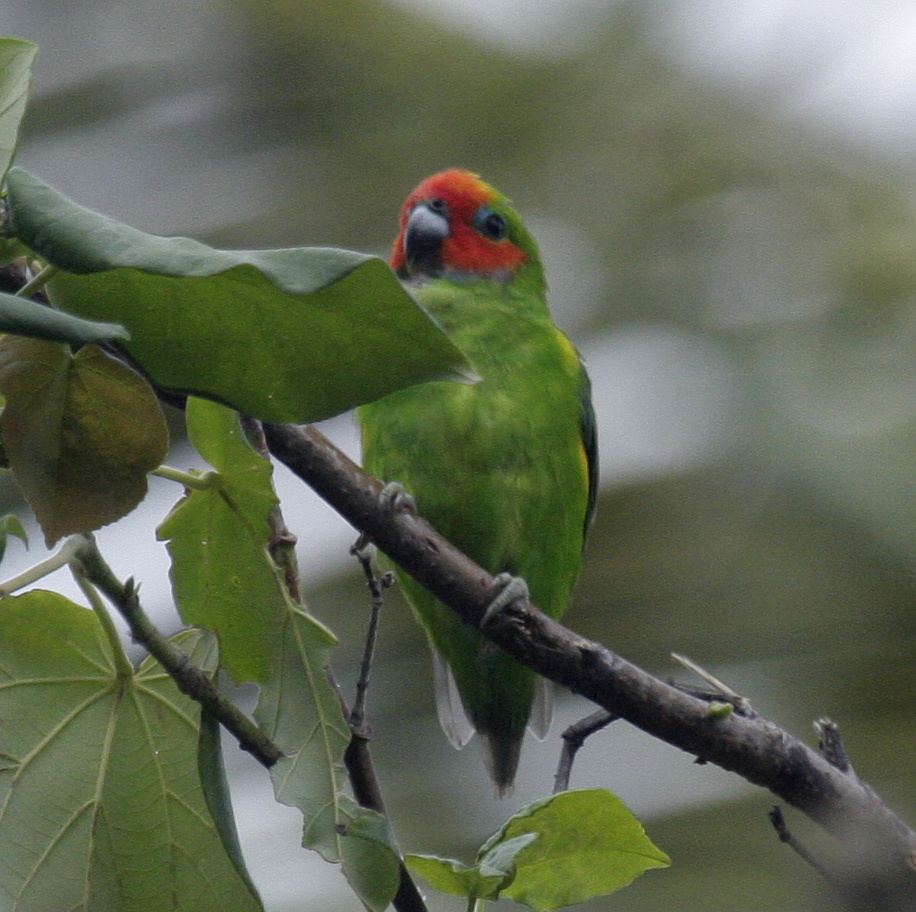

Scientific classification
- Kingdom: Animalia
- Phylum: Chordata
- Class: Aves
- Order: Psittaciformes
- Family: Psittaculidae
- Genus: Cyclopsitta
- Species: C. diophthalma
- Subspecies: C. d. marshalli

Trinomial name
- Cyclopsitta diophthalma marshalli (Iredale, 1946)

= Marshall's fig parrot =

Subspecies of bird

Marshall's fig parrot (Cyclopsitta diophthalma marshalli) is a subspecies of double-eyed fig parrot from the Cape York Peninsula in Queensland, Australia.

Measuring 13–15 cm tall, it is bright green. The male has red facial markings. The female has blue and grey facial markings.

It usually lives in rainforests. It feeds on figs, fruit and nectar.
