= Pullen Pullen Reserve =

- IUCN category II (national park)
- Location within Queensland
- Location: Queensland
- Nearest town: Boulia
- Coordinates: 22.7°S 140.9°E (approx.)
- Area: 56,040 ha (216.4 sq mi)
- Governing body: Bush Heritage Australia
- Website: https://www.bushheritage.org.au/places/pullen-pullen

Pullen Pullen Reserve is a 56,040-hectare property on Maiawali Country in western Queensland, Australia, owned by Bush Heritage Australia. The reserve was designated specifically for the purpose of protecting the endangered night parrot. The exact location has not been released.

While the sanctuary was created to protect the night parrot, other endangered species residing in the area include the plains wanderer, painted honeyeater, grey falcon, and kowari. During bird survey in October-November 2021 a team of ecologists recorded 85 bird species on the reserve.

The landscape features spectacular sandstone, claystone and siltstone plateaus, with areas of long unburnt spinifex that's important roosting and breeding habitat for Night Parrots. The proximity of this habitat to feeding grounds with prolifically seeding ephemeral plant species, such as the annual grass Uranthoecium truncatum, is likely to be a crucial feature required by the parrot.

In 2020, Pullen Pullen was declared a Special Wildlife Reserve by the Queensland government.

== Management ==
An Arid Zone Conservation Base has been constructed at Pullen Pullen to support conservation management staff and research scientists working on the reserve.

To reduce bird-strike mortalities internal and some boundary fences of the reserve have been removed.

Since Night Parrots roost and breed on the ground feral cats are a critical threat. Therefore Bush Heritage impliments a cat control program
