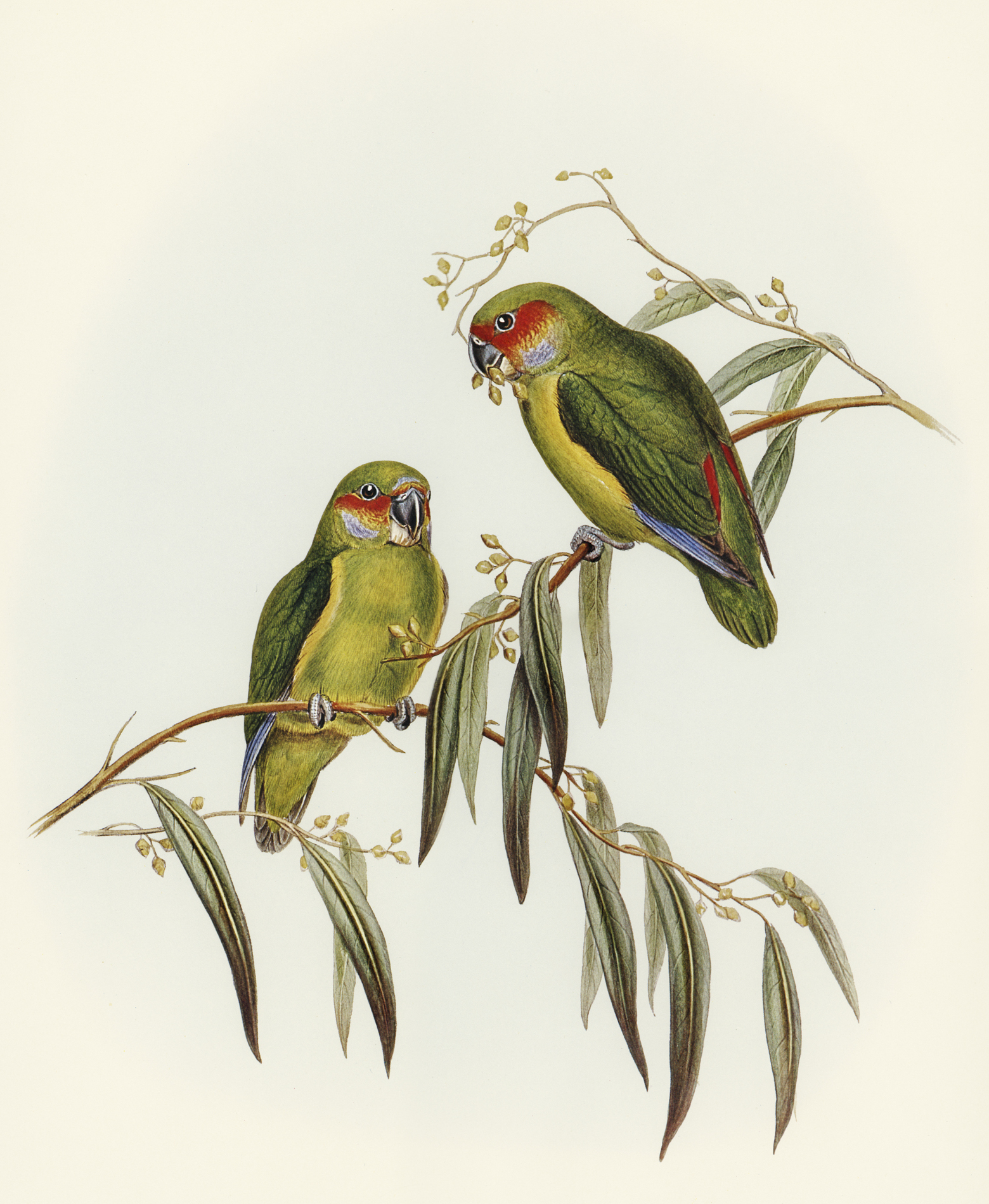

Conservation status
- Critically Endangered (IUCN 3.1)
- CITES Appendix I

Scientific classification
- Kingdom: Animalia
- Phylum: Chordata
- Class: Aves
- Order: Psittaciformes
- Family: Psittaculidae
- Genus: Cyclopsitta
- Species: C. diophthalma
- Subspecies: C. d. coxeni

Trinomial name
- Cyclopsitta diophthalma coxeni Gould, 1867

Synonyms
- Cyclopsitta coxeni; Opopsitta coxeni

= Coxen's fig parrot =

Subspecies of bird

Coxen's fig parrot (Cyclopsitta diophthalma coxeni), also known as the blue-browed, red-faced or southern fig parrot or lorilet, is one of the smallest and least known Australian parrots. It is a highly endangered subspecies of the double-eyed fig parrot. It was named by John Gould after his brother-in-law Charles Coxen.

== Description ==
Coxen's fig parrot is about 15–16 cm long, larger than the other subspecies of double-eyed fig parrot. Its very short tail gives it a top-heavy, big-headed appearance. It is predominantly bright yellowish-green in colour with a blue forehead surrounded by a few scattered red feathers, and with orange-red cheeks bordered below by a variable mauve-blue band. The female is similar in appearance to the male, though slightly duller in colouration. Its flight is rapid and direct, generally above the forest canopy. It can be distinguished from little and musk lorikeets by its dumpier build, more rounded wings and seemingly tail-less silhouette. In flight its call is harsher and more staccato than that of the little lorikeet. However, because it is small, rare, green, silent when feeding and tends to stay high in the foliage of the forest canopy, it is very seldom seen.

== Distribution and habitat ==
The subspecies is restricted to south-eastern Queensland and north-eastern New South Wales, and used to range from Gympie and the Blackall Range, and possibly the Maryborough district, in the north, to the Macleay River in the south, and to the Bunya Mountains and Koreelah Range in the west. There are also unconfirmed reports from outside its accepted former range. It inhabits lowland and foothill subtropical rainforest with fig trees, occasionally visiting fruit trees in gardens and farmland.

== Behaviour ==
=== Breeding ===
As with other subspecies of the double-eyed fig parrot, Coxen's fig parrot excavates its own nesting hollow in decaying wood of living or dead forest trees. Although signs of nest excavating have been found, no active nests have been recorded.

=== Feeding ===
Coxen's fig parrot feeds mainly on figs and other fleshy fruits. It has also been recorded feeding on the nectar of the silky oak. Other subspecies are known to consume insect larvae as well.

== Status and conservation ==
Coxen's fig parrot is listed as endangered by both the Queensland and New South Wales state governments as well as under the Commonwealth Environment Protection and Biodiversity Conservation Act 1999. The main cause of the decline in range and population is the clearing of lowland rainforests for agriculture and housing, as well as logging of rainforest trees. In 2000 it was estimated that there are no more than 100 mature individuals of the subspecies left, with the population severely fragmented and continuing to decline. The species survival is strongly linked to food availability and is impacted by habitat fragmentation and isolation between patches, which makes the protection and rehabilitation of this habitat outside of current protected areas critical to its survival.

== See also ==
- Blue-fronted fig parrot
