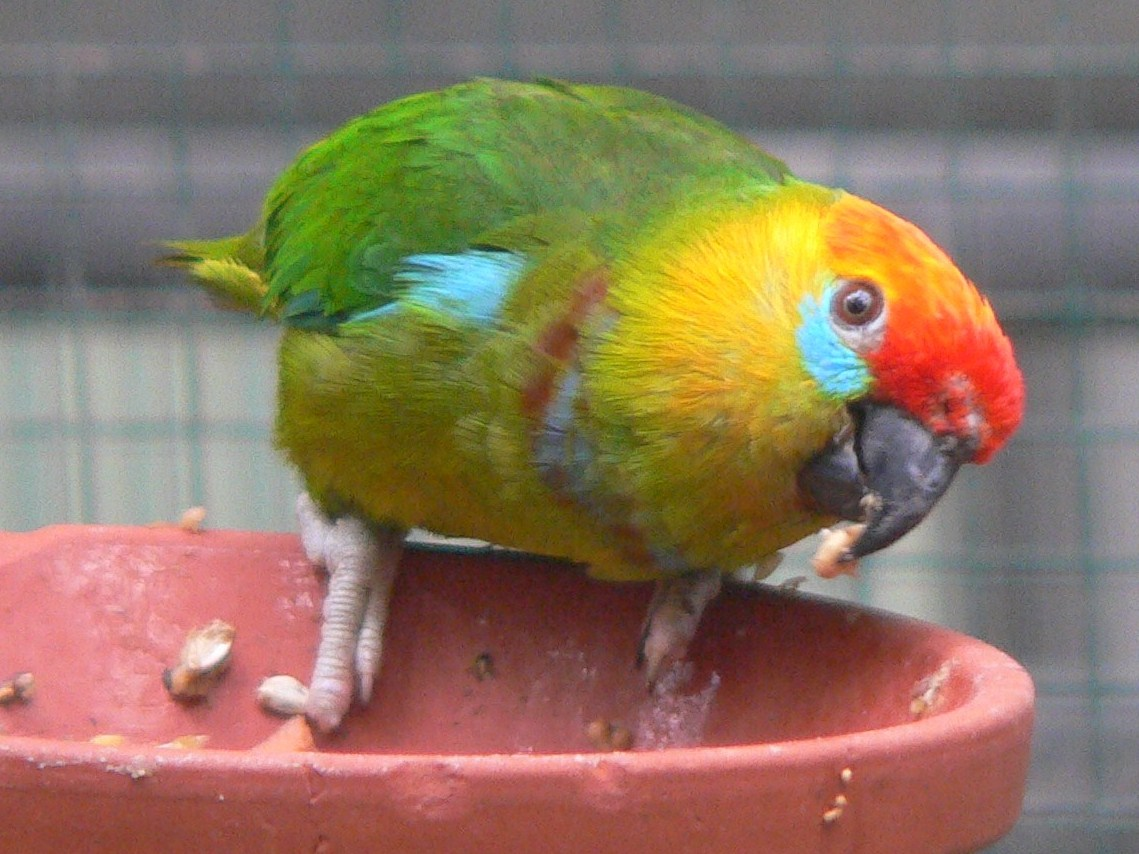
- Psittaculirostris desmarestii occidentalis

Conservation status
- Least Concern (IUCN 3.1)

Scientific classification
- Kingdom: Animalia
- Phylum: Chordata
- Class: Aves
- Order: Psittaciformes
- Family: Psittaculidae
- Genus: Cyclopsitta
- Species: C. desmarestii

Binomial name
- Cyclopsitta desmarestii (Desmarest, 1826)

Synonyms
- Psittaculirostris desmarestii

= Large fig parrot =

Species of bird

The large fig parrot (Cyclopsitta desmarestii), also known as flame-headed fig parrot and Desmarest's fig parrot, is a species of parrot in the family Psittaculidae. It is found in the West Papuan Islands, Indonesia and in southern and western New Guinea (Indonesia and Papua New Guinea).

== Description ==
It has a red to orange cap, a light blue eye patch below its eye, yellow face, pale turquoise ring tinged with red, grey-black bill and green body. Male and female adults are identical in external appearance and juveniles tend to have duller colours on the head, but otherwise resemble adults.

== Habitat ==
Its natural habitats are subtropical or tropical moist lowland forest, subtropical or tropical mangrove forest, and subtropical or tropical moist montane forest.

== Subspecies ==
Five subspecies are recognised:

- C. d. blythii Wallace, AR, 1864 – Misool (Raja Ampat Islands, off western New Guinea)
- C. d. occidentalis (Salvadori, AT, 1876) – Salawati and Batanta Islands, western Bird's Head Peninsula, and Onin Peninsula (northwestern New Guinea)
- C. d. desmarestii (Desmarest, A-G, 1826) – western New Guinea (eastern regions of Bird's Head Peninsula)
- C. d. godmani (Ogilvie-Grant, WR, 1911) – southern lowlands of western and central New Guinea (Mimika River to Fly River)
- C. d. cervicalis (Salvadori, AT & d'Albertis, LM, 1876) – southeastern New Guinea (Fly River to far eastern Papua New Guinea)

== Cited texts ==
- Forshaw, Joseph M. (2006). Parrots of the World; an Identification Guide. Illustrated by Frank Knight. Princeton University Press. ISBN 0-691-09251-6.
