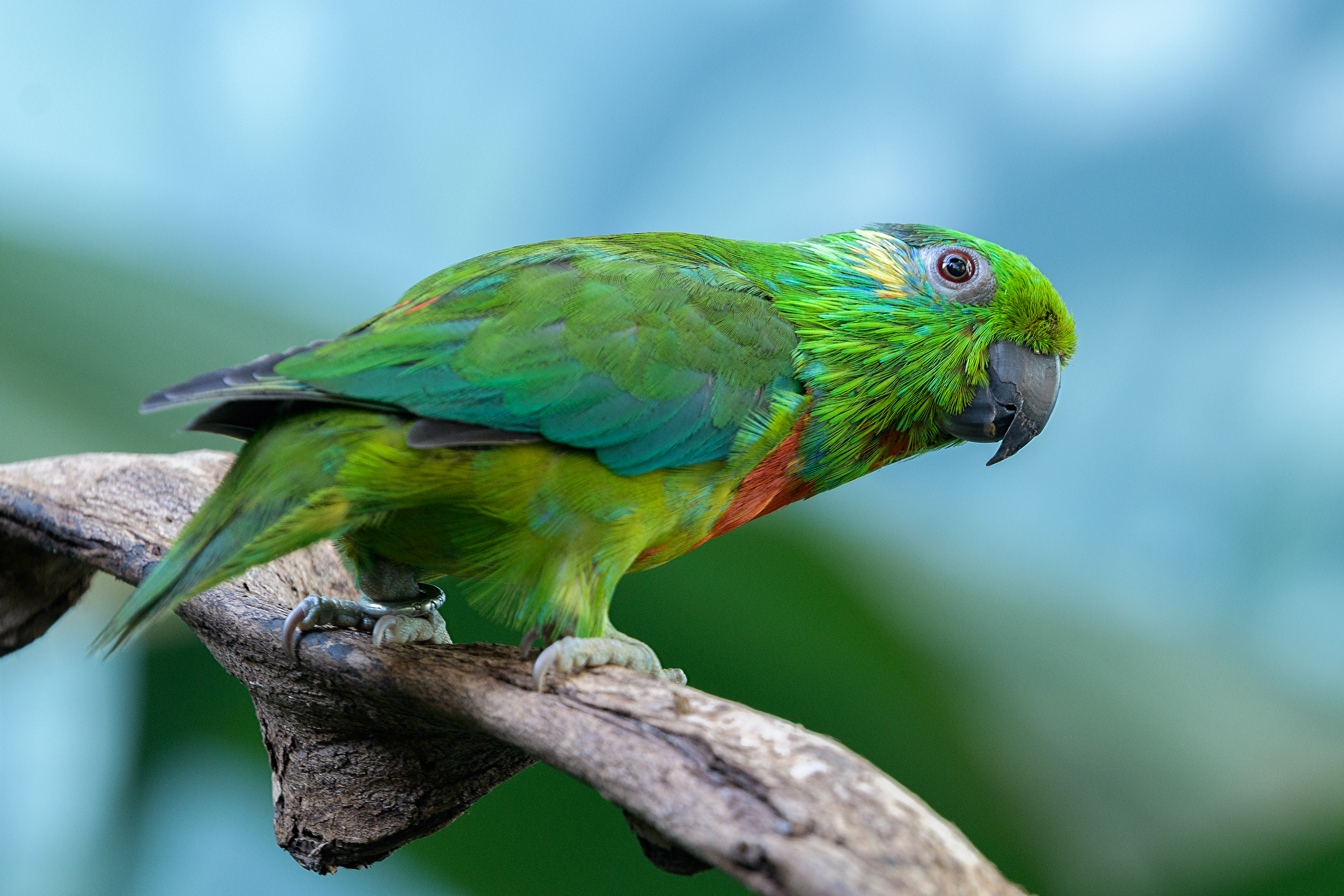

Conservation status
- Least Concern (IUCN 3.1)

Scientific classification
- Kingdom: Animalia
- Phylum: Chordata
- Class: Aves
- Order: Psittaciformes
- Family: Psittaculidae
- Genus: Cyclopsitta
- Species: C. salvadorii

Binomial name
- Cyclopsitta salvadorii (Oustalet, 1880)

Synonyms
- Psittaculirostris salvadorii

= Salvadori's fig parrot =

Species of bird

Salvadori's fig parrot (Cyclopsitta salvadorii) is a species of parrot in the family Psittaculidae endemic to the northern part of the Papua province in Indonesia.

== Taxonomy ==
The name is in honour of Italian zoologist and ornithologist Tommaso Salvadori. The species is monotypic: no subspecies are recognised.

== Description ==
These birds are sexually dimorphic. The male of the species has an orange breast patch and yellow cheeks, while the female has a pale blue breast patch and greenish-yellow cheeks. The juveniles of the species all resemble females until adult plumage begins to grow in.

== Diet ==
Salvadori's fig parrot is a frugivore; the diet consists mainly of figs and other fruit.
