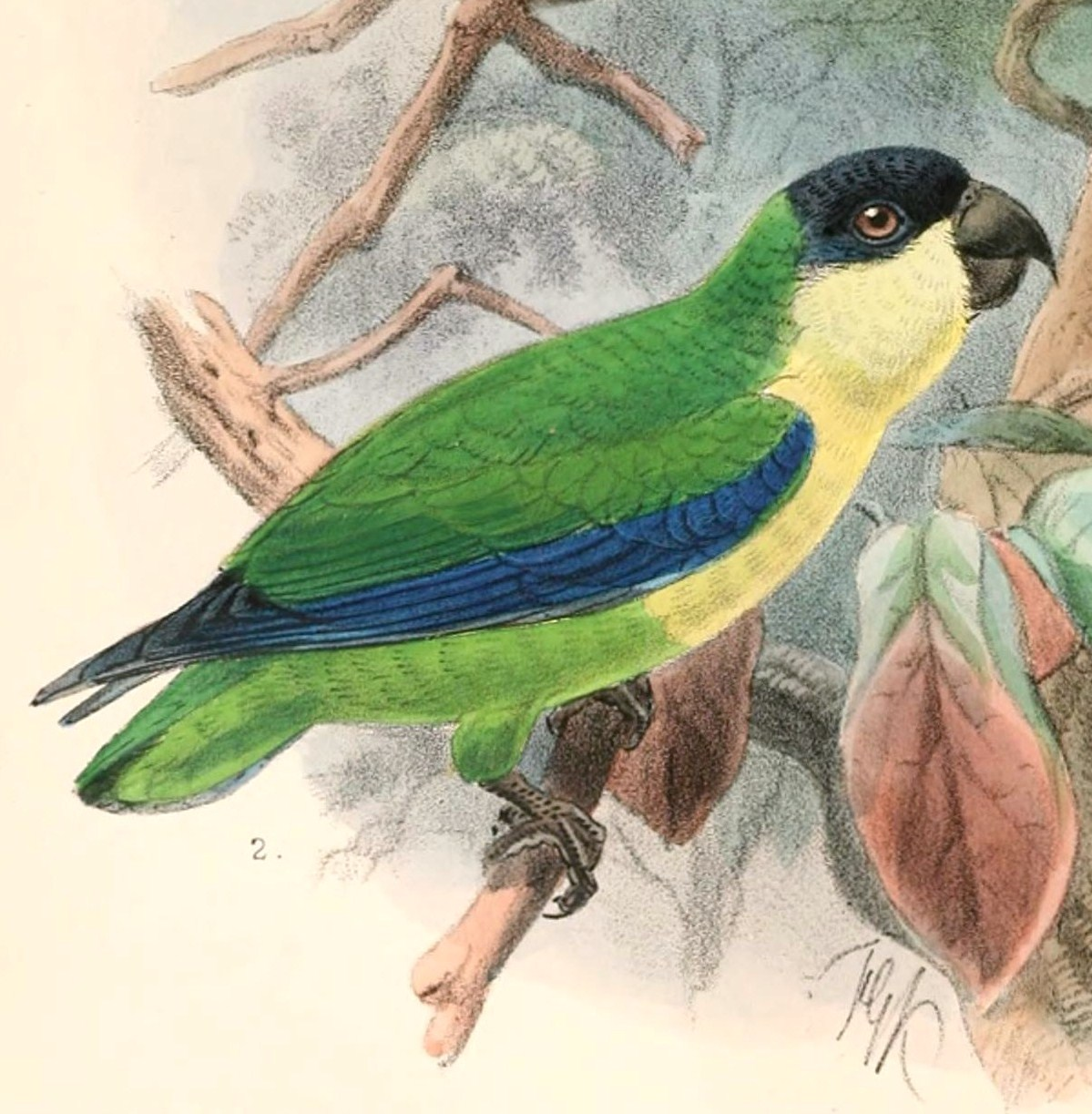
- Subspecies N. n. amabilis

Conservation status
- Least Concern (IUCN 3.1)

Scientific classification
- Kingdom: Animalia
- Phylum: Chordata
- Class: Aves
- Order: Psittaciformes
- Family: Psittaculidae
- Genus: Nannopsittacus
- Species: N. nigrifrons

Binomial name
- Nannopsittacus nigrifrons (Reichenow, 1891)

Synonyms
- Cyclopsitta nigrifrons

= Black-fronted fig parrot =

Species of bird

The black-fronted fig parrot (Nannopsittacus nigrifrons) is a species of parrot in the family Psittaculidae. It is found in northern New Guinea. Its natural habitat is subtropical or tropical moist lowland forests.

== Subspecies ==
Two subspecies are recognised:

- N. n. nigrifrons (Reichenow, A, 1891) – northern New Guinea
- N. n. amabilis (Reichenow, A, 1891) – northeastern New Guinea
