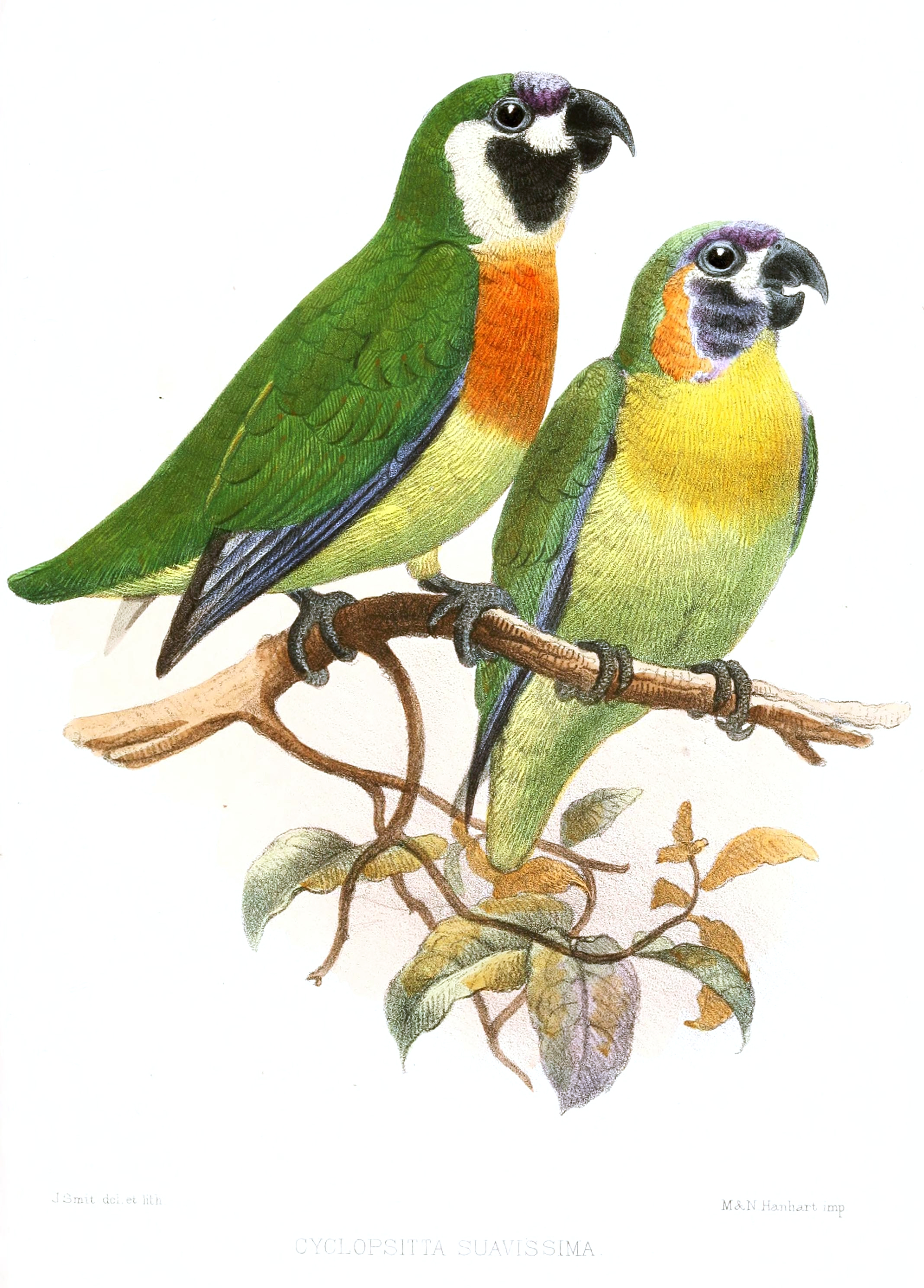
- Subspecies N. m. suavissimus
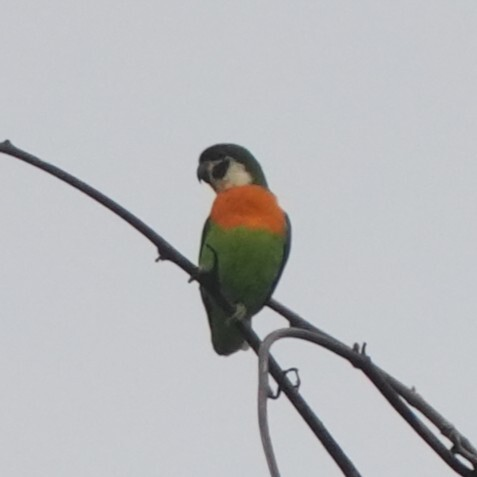

Conservation status
- Least Concern (IUCN 3.1)

Scientific classification
- Kingdom: Animalia
- Phylum: Chordata
- Class: Aves
- Order: Psittaciformes
- Family: Psittaculidae
- Genus: Nannopsittacus
- Species: N. melanogenia

Binomial name
- Nannopsittacus melanogenia (Rosenberg, HKB, 1866)

Synonyms
- Cyclopsitta melanogenia

= Dusky-cheeked fig parrot =

Species of bird

The dusky-cheeked fig parrot (Nannopsittacus melanogenia) is a species of parrot in the family Psittaculidae. It is found in southern New Guinea and the Aru Islands. Its natural habitat is subtropical or tropical moist lowland forests.

== Subspecies ==
Three subspecies are recognised:

- N. m. melanogenia (Rosenberg, KBH, 1866) – Aru Islands (off southwestern New Guinea)
- N. m. suavissimus (Salvadori, AT, 1876) – southeastern Papua New Guinea
- N. m. fuscifrons (Salvadori, AT, 1876) – southern New Guinea
