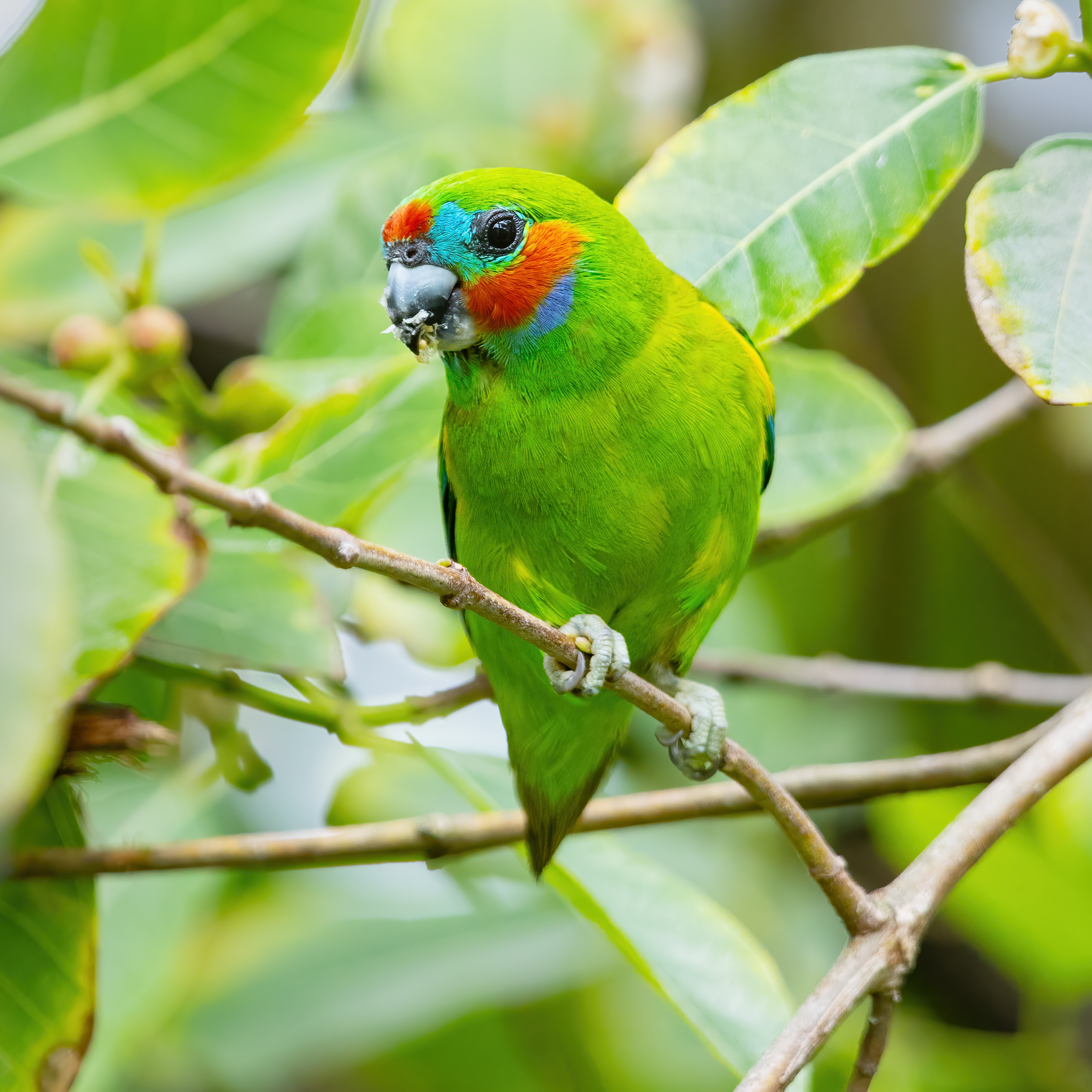
- C. d. macleayana, Queensland, Australia

Conservation status
- Least Concern (IUCN 3.1)

Scientific classification
- Kingdom: Animalia
- Phylum: Chordata
- Class: Aves
- Order: Psittaciformes
- Family: Psittaculidae
- Genus: Cyclopsitta
- Species: C. diophthalma

Binomial name
- Cyclopsitta diophthalma (Hombron & Jacquinot, 1841)

= Double-eyed fig parrot =

Species of bird

The double-eyed fig parrot (Cyclopsitta diophthalma), also known as the blue-faced fig parrot, red-faced fig parrot, dwarf fig parrot, and the two-eyed fig parrot, primarily inhabits forests on New Guinea and nearby islands, but is also found in isolated communities along the tropical Australian coast, east of the Great Dividing Range. With an average total length of about 14 cm (5 1/2 in), it is the smallest parrot in Australia.

Most subspecies of the double-eyed fig parrot are sexually dimorphic, with males having more red (less silvery and blue) to the face than the females. It is predominantly green with a very short tail, a disproportionately large head and bill, and red and blue facial markings. Its name is derived from a blue spot on the lores, which in New Guinean birds is roughly the same size as the eyes.

Although assessed as of Least Concern by the IUCN, certain subspecies are under threat. Coxen's fig parrot (C. d. coxeni) is of one Australia's rarest and least known birds, having been recorded on fewer than 200 occasions since being described by Gould in 1866. It is classified as Endangered in Queensland (Nature Conservation Act 1992), New South Wales (New South Wales Threatened Species Conservation Act 1995), and also nationally in Australia (Environment Protection and Biodiversity Conservation Act 1999) as it has declined due, at least in part, to the clearing of lowland subtropical rainforest over its range.

== Behaviour ==
The double-eyed fig parrot generally forages for figs, berries, seeds, nectar, and the grubs of wood-boring insects. This foraging is done in pairs or in a flock of only a few individuals. It tends to fly in a quick and direct manner. It produces a short and shrill call. Unlike many other parrots which generally use existing holes in trees for nests, double-eyed fig parrots excavate their own nest cavities, usually in a rotten tree.

Double-eyed fig parrots utter high-pitched, clipped, two or three note zzzt-zzzt or zeet-zeet calls, unlike the rolling or trilling screeches typical of lorikeets. These calls are mostly made in flight, but sometimes when perched. When engrossed in feeding, it may also make a variety of softer, chattering noises.

Eight subspecies of the double-eyed fig parrot are described. Cyclopsitta diophthalma coxeni, C. d. macleayana, and C. d. marshalli are restricted to Australia, and the other five are restricted to New Guinea and associated islands.

== Subspecies ==
- C. d. aruensis (Aru double-eyed fig parrot)
- C. d. coccineifrons (Astrolabe Mountain fig parrot)
- C. d. coxeni (Coxen's fig parrot)
- C. d. diophthalma
- C. d. inseparabilis (Tagula fig parrot)
- C. d. macleayana (Macleay's fig parrot or red-browed fig parrot)
- C. d. marshalli (Marshall's fig parrot)
- C. d. virago (Hartert's double-eyed fig parrot)

== Gallery ==
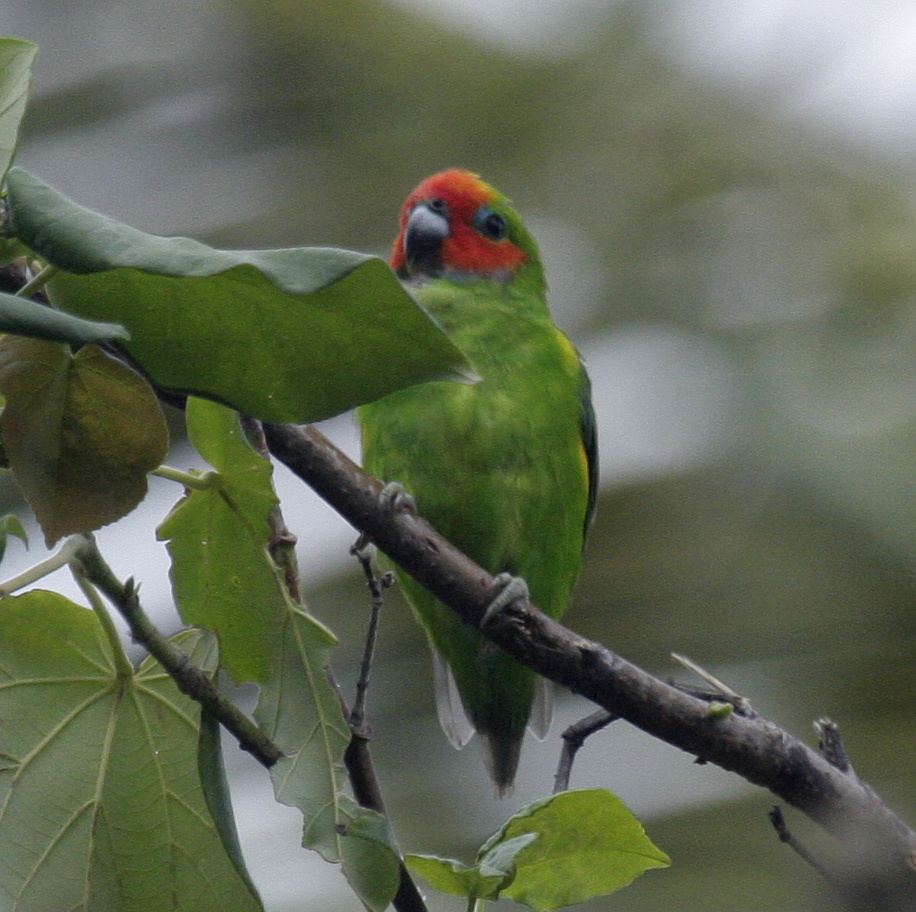
Male C. d. marshalli

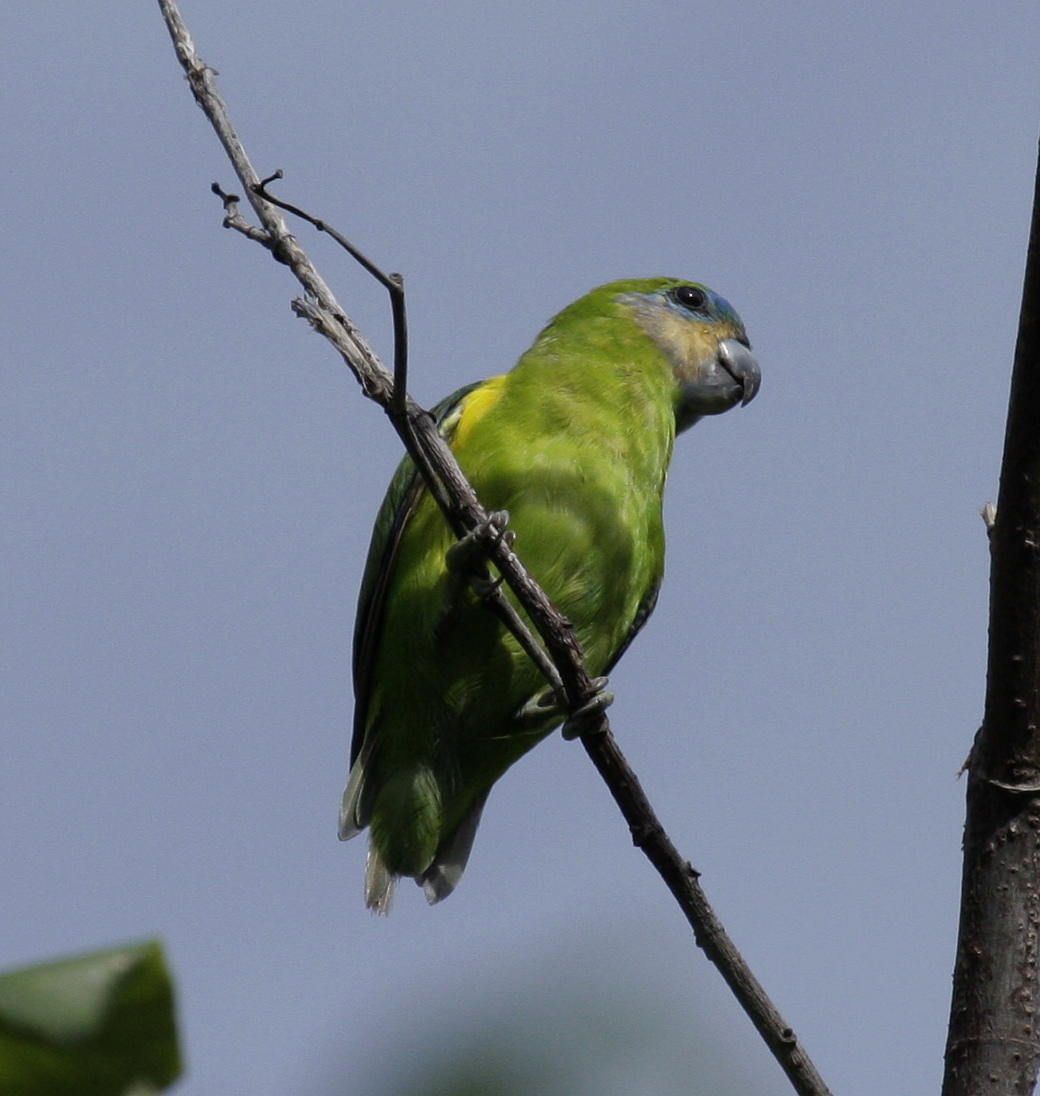
Female C. d. marshalli from the Cape York Peninsula, Australia

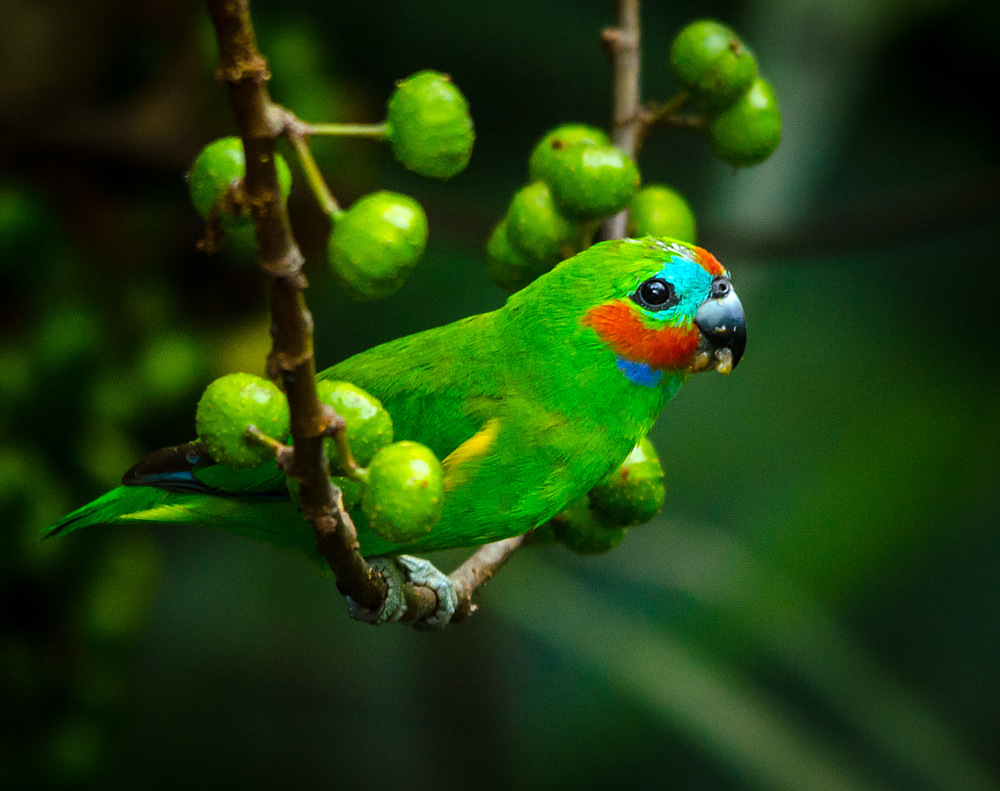
Male C. d. macleayana in Daintree National Park, Queensland, Australia

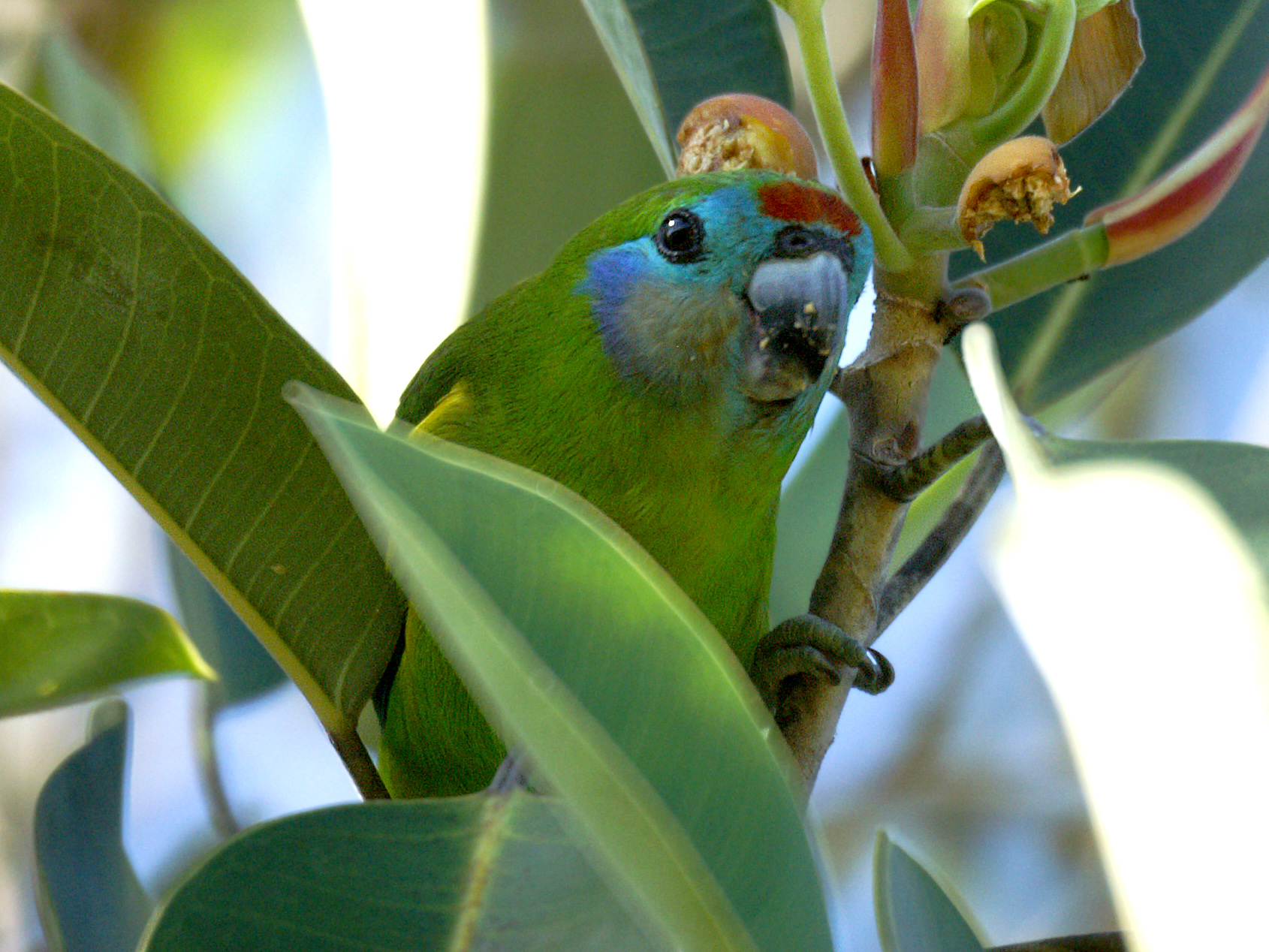
Female C. d. macleayana in Cairns, Queensland, Australia

== See also ==
- Blue-fronted fig parrot
