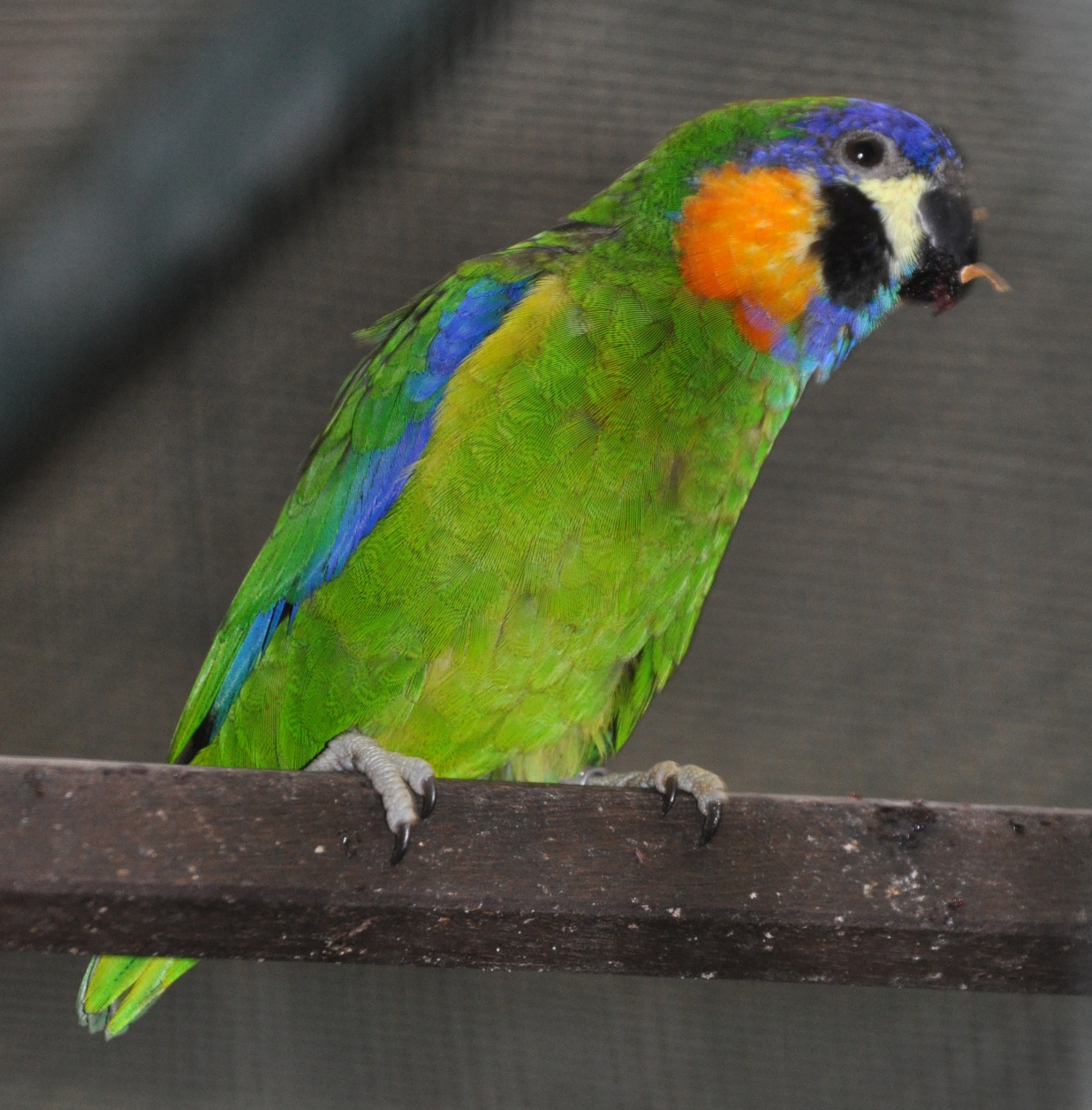
- Female
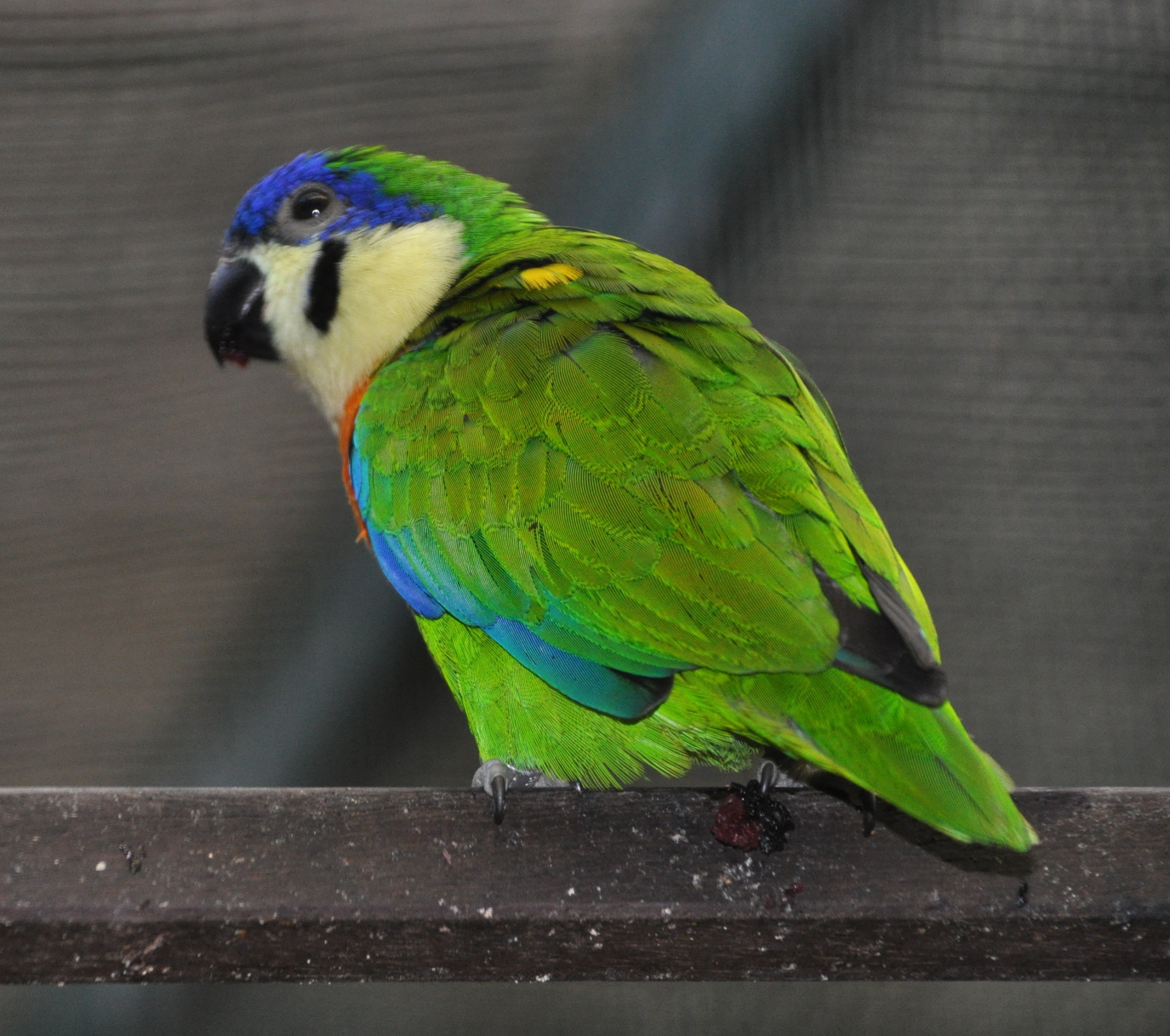
- Male

Conservation status
- Least Concern (IUCN 3.1)

Scientific classification
- Kingdom: Animalia
- Phylum: Chordata
- Class: Aves
- Order: Psittaciformes
- Family: Psittaculidae
- Genus: Nannopsittacus
- Species: N. gulielmitertii

Binomial name
- Nannopsittacus gulielmitertii (Schlegel, 1866)

Synonyms
- Cyclopsitta gulielmitertii

= Blue-fronted fig parrot =

Species of bird

The blue-fronted fig parrot (Nannopsittacus gulielmitertii) is a species of parrot in the family Psittaculidae. It is found in Salawati and the Bird's Head Peninsula in New Guinea. Its natural habitat is subtropical or tropical moist lowland forests.

== Taxonomy ==
The specific epithet gulielmitertii is in honour of William III, King of the Netherlands, and is derived from the Medieval Latin Guilelmus, meaning William, and Latin tertius, meaning third. Alternative names for the species include William's fig parrot and King of Holland fig parrot. The blue-fronted fig parrot is monotypic: no subspecies are recognised.

== Description ==
The blue-fronted fig parrot is primarily green with a black bill, white face with a black patch. Males have orange breasts while females have orange patches on their faces.

== Distribution and habitat ==
It inhabits lowland forest on New Guinea, the Bird's Head Peninsula and Salawati. It is generally found at elevations of 0–300 m (0–984 ft), but can be found up to elevations of 1,100 m (3,600 ft).

== Behaviour and ecology ==
The blue-fronted fig parrot typically stays in small flocks of 6-10 individuals. It mainly inhabits the canopy, but can also be found in lower stories.

=== Diet ===
Mainly feeds on fig seeds, but also on seeds of Glochidion and Acacia auriculaeformis. It also eats the flower heads of Poikilospermum plants.

=== Breeding ===
It breeds from December to June. The nest is typically a hole made in an arboreal termite mound, but may also be made in epiphytes. In captivity, clutches are usually of 2 eggs, although they may be from 1-3 eggs, and the incubation period is 20-22 days, with a nestling period of 35-42 days.

== Status ==
The blue-fronted fig parrot is listed as least-concern by the IUCN.
