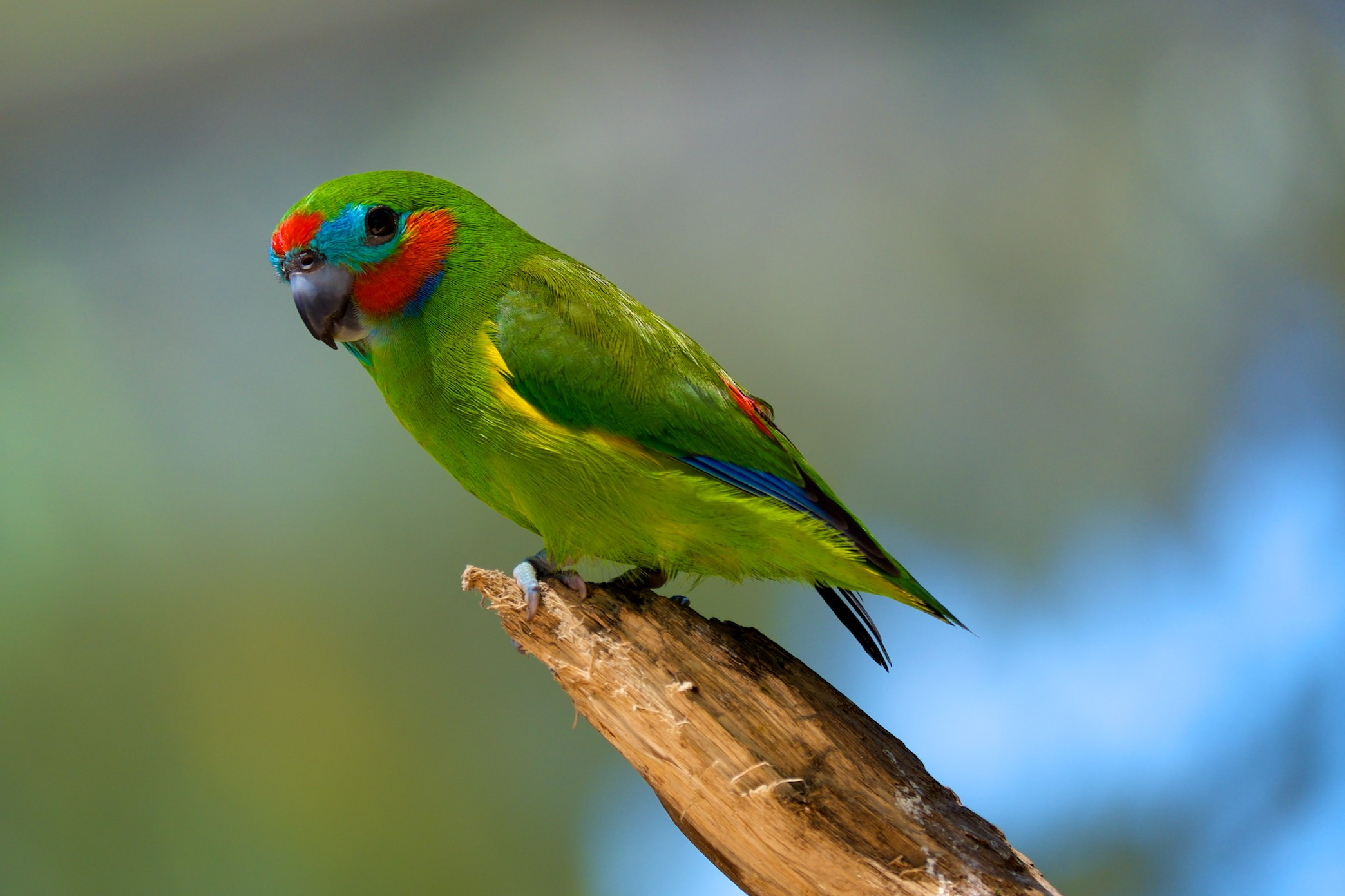
- Double-eyed fig parrot

Scientific classification
- Kingdom: Animalia
- Phylum: Chordata
- Class: Aves
- Order: Psittaciformes
- Family: Psittaculidae
- Tribe: Cyclopsittini
- Genus: Cyclopsitta; Reichenbach, 1850

Type species
- Psittacula diophthalma Hombron & Jacquinot, 1841

Species
- Four; see text

Synonyms
- Psittaculirostris Gray, JE & Gray, GR, 1859

= Cyclopsitta =

Genus of birds

Cyclopsitta is a genus of parrots in the family Psittaculidae. Its four species are native to the island of New Guinea. There are also fig parrots in the genus Nannopsittacus.

The genus contains four species:

Image	Common name	Scientific name	Distribution
	Double-eyed fig parrot	Cyclopsitta diophthalma	New Guinea and satellites and northeast Australia
	Large fig parrot	Cyclopsitta desmarestii	New Guinea and northwest satellites
	Edwards's fig parrot	Cyclopsitta edwardsii	lowlands of northeastern New Guinea (Humboldt Bay to Huon Gulf)
	Salvadori's fig parrot	Cyclopsitta salvadorii	northwestern New Guinea (eastern shore of Cenderawasih Bay to Cyclops Mountains)

The genus name Cyclopsitta is a combination of the Greek name of the mythical Cyclops (a race of one-eyed Sicilian giants, whose name is a combination of the Greek word kuklos, meaning "circle" and ōps, meaning "eye"), and the modern Latin psitta, meaning "parrot".
