= Mandai Orchid Garden =

Defunct orchid garden

- Mandai Orchid Gardens
- Location within Singapore
- Type: garden
- Nearest town: Mandai
- Coordinates: 1°24′24.8″N 103°47′00.6″E
- Area: 5 acres (20,000 m^{2})
- Established: 1951; 75 years ago
- Closed: 1 January 2011; 15 years ago
- Founder: John Laycock
- Owner: Singapore Orchids Private Limited
- Operator: Singapore Orchids Private Limited
- Status: Demolished

The Mandai Orchid Garden (also known as Mandai Orchid Gardens) was an orchid garden established in 1951 by John Laycock at Mandai Lake Road in Mandai, Singapore. Initially, MOG was used as an orchid farm where orchids were grown and harvested before being converted into an orchid garden for tourism. Before it was closed down in 2011, it was owned by Singapore Orchids Private Limited.

== History ==
The garden was first established in 1951 by John Laycock, a lawyer and a founding member of the Orchid Society of South East Asia. Laycock (who had an affinity for orchids) along with orchid merchant Lee Kim Hong established the garden to grow Laycock's expanding collection of orchids. Together, they bought 5 acres of land on Mandai Road, eventually leading to the creation of the MOG.

On 1 January 2011, the garden ceased operations upon the expiry of its lease, and the land and was slated for development into a new tourist attraction. In the first quarter of 2018, the Mandai Wildlife Bridge was built near and above its former site, it was officially opened on 6 December 2019.

The aviary known as Bird Paradise was opened in 2023, occupying the most of left part of its former site and adopted its remnant artificial structure Orchid Waterfall.
