= John Ede =

Singaporean politician (1913–2003)

John Anthony Moore Ede (1913 – 23 January 2003) was a member of the Legislative Assembly of Singapore, the chairman of the Singapore Anti-Tuberculosis Association, the General Manager of Cathay Organisation, the secretary of the Singapore Progressive Party and a pioneer of the orchid trade on the island.

== Early life ==
Ede was born in England in 1913. He lived in India for eleven years before coming to Singapore in 1946.

== Career ==
In 1947, he became a manager at the Cathay Organisation. In December, he became the company's general manager. From 1952 to 1953, he served as the secretary of the Singapore Progressive Party. In 1955, he was elected a member of the Legislative Assembly of Singapore representing Tanglin. In 1959, he and 102 other members of the Liberal Socialist Party, which was formed following the merger of the Progressive Party with the Democratic Party in 1956, resigned from the party in protest of the party's decision to reverse its original decision align with the Singapore People's Alliance and the UMNO-MCA in the upcoming general election. He joined the Singapore People's Alliance on 28 May.

Ede was also a professor of English literature, and served as the honorary secretary of the Cinematograph Association of Singapore in the early 1950s. From 1951 to 1959, he served as the chairman of the Singapore Musical Society. From 1954 to 1960, he served as a council member of the Singapore Anti-Tuberculosis Association. He also served as the association's president from 1955 to 1957. From 1973 to 1983, he served as a member of the Presidential Council for Minority Rights.

== Mandai Orchid Gardens ==
Ede retired as the general manager of Cathay in 1962 to devote time to running the Mandai Orchid Gardens with his wife Amy, who was the second female member of the Municipal Commission of Singapore. He, along with Amy, merchant Lee Kim Hong and Rosalind Lee, became partners of Singapore Orchids Private Limited, which owned the gardens. Ede also served as the company's managing director, and continued the company's selective breeding program. From 1967 to 1980, he served as the president of the Singapore Gardening Society. By 1950, The company had begun exporting orchids to New York, Australia and Europe. He also served on the management committee of the Malayan Orchid Society. The couple wrote several books in the 1980s, such as Living With Orchids and Living With Plants. In 1989, he was awarded the Public Service Star by then-President of Singapore Wee Kim Wee for his contributions to the Orchid trade in Singapore.

== Personal life and death ==
Ede married Amy Laycock on 30 October 1953.

Ede died on 23 January 2003. Following his death, Amy sold the gardens.
