= Amy Ede =

Singaporean politician (1923–2007)

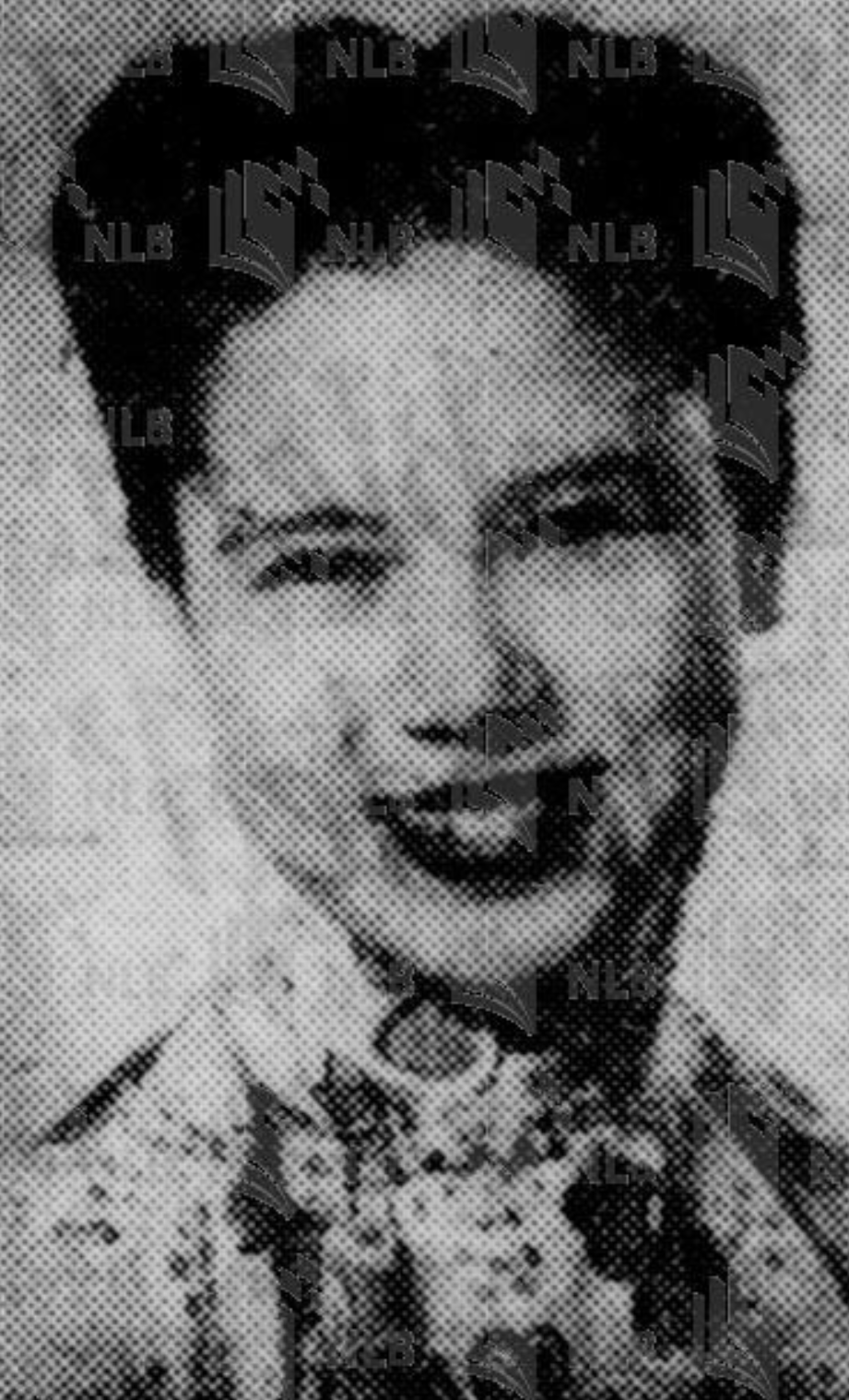
Ede, pictured in 1949

Amy Ede (née Laycock; 1923 – 8 November 2007) was a Singaporean politician and a local pioneer of the orchid trade. She was the second female member of the Singapore Municipal Commission. Three orchid hybrids are named after her.

== Early life and education ==
Ede was born in 1923 to Chinese parents. She had four siblings. She and her siblings were later adopted by Englishman John Laycock, and she studied at the Convent of the Holy Infant Jesus. During WWII, she was sent to Mumbai to join the Indian auxiliary nursing service. She was then dispatched to Basra for two years.

== Career ==
=== Politics ===
Following the end of the war, her adoptive father persuaded her to enter politics. She joined the Singapore Progressive Party, which he had co-founded, and ran as a candidate for East Ward in the April 1949 Singapore Municipal Commission election, alongside S. H. Aljunied and Frank Caulfield James. She was the youngest candidate in the elections, and was one of two women contesting in the elections, with the other being Phyllis Eu Cheng Li. She made her maiden speech as a candidate on 11 March. However, she lost the election. Following her loss, she was elected into the Hospitals Board by the unofficial members of the legislative council. She also became the party's secretary. After this, she ran as a candidate for East Ward in the December 1949 Singapore Municipal Commission election, running against Mak Pak Shee of the Labour Front. She was first introduced to Mak by Pat Johnson, also of the Labour Front, at a party, where Mak assured her that he would not be standing against her in the elections. She won the election with 1,006 out of the total 1,584 votes. This made her the second female member of the Singapore Municipal Commission, after Eu, who had been elected to the commission in April.

She soon began campaigning for better health service for kampong mothers in the East Ward, and forming a united front with Goh Hood Kiat and Frank Caulfield James, the other commissioners of the ward. They campaigned for the electrification of Geylang Road from Kallang Bridge to Joo Chiat Road to be made a priority in the 1950 electric lighting scheme. In January 1950, she began campaigning for the improvement of water facilities for the residents of Geylang Serai, after visiting the residences of several of the area's residents. She also proposed the introduction of mobile clinics to serve mothers living in rural areas who did not have easy access to municipal clinics. However, she was later told that due to a lack of funding, plans to establish sub-clinics in rural areas were delayed. In March 1952, she urged the government to repair the sea walls in Marine Parade. In May, she encouraged women to join the Civil Defence Corps, and suggested that women who were embarrassed about joining the corps join in groups instead. In July, she urged the city council to improve the five roads leading up to Marine Parade, of which only two were proper roads. She officially opened the Progressive Party's Paya Lebar Branch Office on 19 October.

She was re-elected in the 1952 Singapore City Council election. In July 1955, she campaigned for the relaxation of the policy on attap houses to allow the construction of new huts in designated areas, as the existing policy forbade the construction of new attap houses. She retired from politics in 1956.

=== Mandai Orchid Garden ===
After retiring from politics, Ede devoted her time to helping her adoptive father run the Mandai Orchid Gardens, which was built on 5 acres of land he had bought in 1951. Her husband retired in 1962 to focus on the business. The couple wrote several books in the 1980s, such as Living With Orchids and Living With Plants. However, following her husband's death in 2003, she decided to sell the business as she was no longer able to run the business by herself.

== Personal life ==
Ede was diagnosed with tuberculosis in 1950. Due to this, she flew to Australia on 28 August to seek medical treatment. She returned to Singapore on 29 November. She married John Ede, then director of the Cathay Organisation as well as the secretary of the Singapore Progressive Party, on 30 October 1953. After the wedding, they went on a two month long honeymoon. Together, they had one daughter, Anita. Ede was a close friend of conservationist and photogtapher Lady Yuen Peng McNeice. She opposed sexism, and believed that there were many cases where women could "do better than men".

=== Death and legacy ===
Ede suffered a stroke in October 2007 and died on 8 November. Her wake was held at 2 Swettenham Road, and her funeral was held at the Saint George's Church on 10 November, after which she was cremated at the Mandai Crematorium and Columbarium. The orchid hybrids Aerides Amy Ede, which was first hybridised by her friend, amateur horticulturist Gracia Lewis, Papilionanthe Amy, which was hybridised by her adoptive father, and the Dendrobium Amy Ede are named in honour of her.
