= List of Heritage Roads in Singapore =

The Heritage Roads scheme was implemented in 2001 by the Singapore government to identify and protect roads whereby there are lush road-side trees, often so dense that they create "green walls" and even "green tunnels". Concerns that rapid urban development will result in the removal of these trees especially due to the widening or realignment of these roads, the authorities identified 5 roads from a list of 55 suggested by the National Parks Board. The remaining roads were placed on a watchlist to be closely monitored, and may be added to the scheme later.

== History ==
As part of Tengah Air Base's expansion, portions of Lim Chu Kang Road, a heritage road, will be closed off.

== List of heritage roads ==
- Arcadia Road
- Lim Chu Kang Road
- Mandai Road
- Mount Pleasant Road
- South Buona Vista Road

== Roads on watchlist include ==
- Goodwood Hill
- Lornie Road
- Loyang Avenue
- Nassim Road
- Punggol Road
- Redhill Close
- Upper Thomson Road
- Yishun Avenue 5
- Yuan Ching Road
