= Rainforest Wild Adventure =

Zoo in Singapore

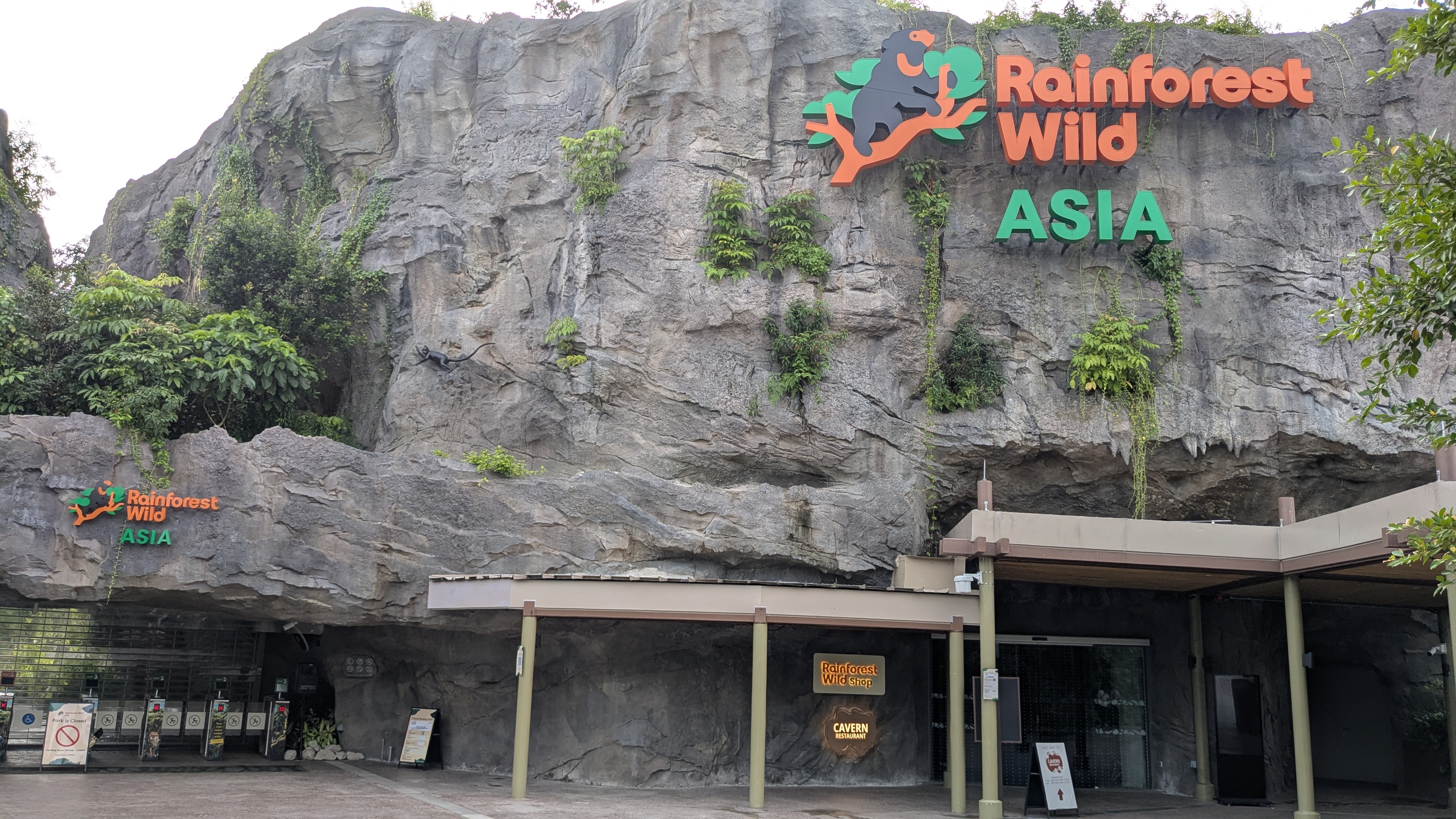
- Interactive map of Rainforest Wild Adventure
- 1°24′33″N 103°46′51″E
- Date opened: 12 March 2025; 19 months ago
- Location: Mandai, Singapore; 20 Mandai Lake Road, Singapore 729825
- Land area: 12 ha (30 acres)
- No. of species: 36
- Public transit: 138 (Note: via TE4 Springleaf and NS16 CR11 Ang Mo Kio); 927 (Note: via NS4 JS1 BP1 Choa Chu Kang)
- Website: Rainforest Wild

Rainforest Wild Adventure, formerly known as Rainforest Wild ASIA and AFRICA is a wildlife park located in Mandai, Singapore. It is managed by the Mandai Wildlife Group, which also manages the Singapore Zoo, Night Safari, River Wonders and Bird Paradise. It highlights animals that live in the rainforests of Asia and Africa, in 2 sections named Rainforest Wild Adventure WEST and Rainforest Wild Adventure EAST. On 12 March 2025, Rainforest Wild Adventure WEST opened as Rainforest Wild ASIA, while construction is still ongoing for the EAST section. It has a stronger focus on adventure, and has been advertised as "Asia's first adventure-based zoological park."

== Rainforest Wild Adventure WEST ==
Rainforest Wild Adventure WEST occupies 13 hectares (32 acres) of land, making it the second smallest of the Mandai parks, after River Wonders. It contains 36 species of animals, with species like François' langur and Philippine spotted deer being displayed for the first time in Singapore. It comprises eight zones: Entrance Gorge, The Karst, The Outpost, Forest Floor, Rock Cascade, The Canopy, Watering Hole, and The Cavern.

Visitors can navigate through the park through a universally designed elevated boardwalk, or explore using designated trails throughout the park.

=== Entrance Gorge ===
This zone replicates the forest edge of rainforest. It has a pond containing Asian arowana and southern river terrapins.

=== The Karst ===
This zone replicates the limestone karst topography François' Langur are often found in the wild. Additionally, visitors may climb a via ferrata, along similar limestone walls in add-on experiences.

=== The Outpost ===
This zone does not contain any animals, serving as a rest stop for visitors to rest and eat at the Ranger's Cafe. It also houses the park's campgrounds, a classroom and shower areas.

=== Forest Floor ===
This zones represents forest floors, the nutrient-rich environment that separates the aboveground section of a forest, and the soil. It is a walk-through enclosure with hog deer, axis deer, lesser mousedeer, and several species of tortoises. Visitors can navigate under fallen trees and over boulders to explore this zone.

=== Rock Cascade ===
This zones showcases a variety of environments, like tall grasses, bamboo groves, and rocky cliffs. Two brother tigers share an exhibit with many of these environments and a large waterfall. This zone also features flexible habitats which rotate groups of predators and prey, like bearded pigs, dholes, and babirusa.

In this zone, there is a food court named Sentinel Food Hall, which offers a variety of South-east Asian cuisine. The food court also has an exhibit with a Burmese python and a blood python, as well as an aviary with Provost's squirrels, Vietnam pheasants, and Bali Myna.

=== The Canopy ===
This zones spotlights the mature trees that make up a rainforest's canopy, housing Javan langurs, red-shanked douc langurs, siamangs, and Philippine spotted deer. This area also features the Langur Walking Nets, which allow visitors to get a bounce around and have a unique view of the forest from the top-down. Add-on experiences also allow visitors to cross a bridge to the Langur Observation Deck, and even feed them.

=== Watering Hole ===
Sun bear

The largest zone in the park, it highlights the role water plays in the ecosystem. It features Malayan sun bears, Malayan tapirs, and a saltwater crocodile named Panjang, which means "long" in Malay. Visitors may see a feeding demonstration with the saltwater crocodile, demonstrating their ability to jump out of the water. Visitors can also see one of the flexible habitats from this section too.

Visitor may sit down at the Watering Hole Cafe in this zone and observe the Malayan Tapir up-close.

=== The Cavern ===
Scans of Gunung Mulu National Park in Borneo were made and recreated to build the 220-metre long man-made cave. As visitors enter the cave, they may step over an exhibit filled with Madagascar hissing cockroaches. The cave is air-conditioned and is separated in two sections, a wet section and a dry section. The wet-section features a pond with soro brook carp and blind cave fish. The cave then opens for a short while for another angle of the saltwater crocodile in the Watering Hole zone, before becoming air-conditioned again. This section contains two open-air exhibits for Asian forest scorpions and Malayan cave racers. The cave ends at The Oculus, representing a sinkhole, a popular photo-taking spot.

It also contains the Cavern Restaurant, which is operated by Tung Lok Group.

=== Additional Experiences ===
Additional experiences are offered at an additional cost. These are grouped into Adventure+ and Black Adventures. The Adventure+ included the AIA Vitality Bounce, a playground made of nets strung among the canopy, and the Canopy Jump, where visitors can free-fall of either a 13m or 20m platform. Black Adventures are the Wild Apex Adventure and the Wild Cavern Adventure. Both are high-element courses, with the Wild Apex Adventure mainly happening at The Karsts, and the Wild Cavern Adventure at The Cavern.

== Rainforest Wild Adventure EAST ==
The second park of Rainforest Wild Adventure will feature the diverse landscapes of the Afro-tropic and Madagascar. Having its soft opening on 20 May 2026 and its grand opening on 29 May 2026.
