= Gracia Lewis =

Singaporean orchid enthusiast

Gracia Lewis (1911 — ) was a Singaporean orchid enthusiast and the vice-president of the Malayan Orchid Society.

== Gardening ==
Lewis took up orchid growing in 1947. She joined the Singapore Gardening Society in the following year, after meeting botanist Richard Eric Holttum. Several years later, she worked at a grower's nursery in England during the Summer, where she learned to hybridise and grow seed.

In 1953, Lewis was awarded the Banksian Medal of the Royal Horticultural Society. On 2 April 1954, she won the Singapore Flower Show for a second time. However, as no exhibitor could win first place in the show more the once in three years, she was instead awarded the R.H.S. Silver Gilt Medal. In the same year, she exhibited her orchids at the Chelsea Flower Show. At the show, she won a gold medal and received two first-class certificates for her orchids.

Her exhibition for the 1955 Singapore Flower Show was the largest exhibition at the show. For her exhibition, she won first place in the large-group orchids section. In June, she raised more than $850 through the sale of her orchids at the English-Speaking Union's Midsummer Market in London. At the 1958 Malayan Orchid Show, her Vanda miniata was declared the best flower at the show, and won her two prizes.

By 1963, she had travelled to most of the orchid growing countries in the world, and had spent several years concentrating on collecting species of orchids in the jungles of Malaya, Borneo and Papua New Guinea. She had also become the vice-president of the Malayan Orchid Society and a member of the Award Judging Panel. She had also hybridised several orchids, including the Aerides Amy Ede, which she named after her friend Amy Ede, a politician and pioneer of the orchid trade in Singapore. At the fourth World Orchid Conference, which was held in Singapore in October 1963, she delivered a speech on Malayan Orchid species. By December 1985, there were seven orchid hybrids named after her.

== Personal life ==
Lewis was married to M. Lewis, an employee of Fraser and Neave. She died sometime prior to September 1992.
