= Arcadia Road =

Road in Singapore

Coordinates: 1°20′5″N 103°48′36.6″E

Arcadia Road is secondary road in Singapore which was designated as a heritage road in 2005. Starting at a junction of Adam Road, it extends for 918 metres before ending. The road is lined with rain trees and is known for its lush greenery.

Prior to the construction of the Pan Island Expressway, Arcadia Road existed as a curving track between the neighbouring hills. It connected users to the paths behind the Eng Neo private estate. The present road skirts past the colonial era Adam Park Estate. It is located amidst the secondary forest near the MacRitchie Reservoir. In 2005, the road was gazetted as a heritage road, which earmarked a 10 metre wide green buffer (on the sides of the road) for conservation.

The sides of the road are lined with mature rain trees as well as condominiums like Hillcrest Arcadia and The Arcadia.
