= Mandai Wildlife Group =

Singaporean zoo organisation

- Formation: 1 August 2000; 26 years ago (as Wildlife Reserves Singapore); 13 October 2021; 5 years ago (as Mandai Wildlife Group)
- Type: Non-profit organisation
- Legal status: Active
- Purpose: Wildlife conservation, sustainability, biodiversity protection
- Headquarters: 80 Mandai Lake Road, Singapore 729826
- Region served: Singapore
- Chairman: Piyush Gupta
- Parent organization: Temasek Holdings
- Website: www.mandai.com

Mandai Wildlife Group is a self-funded organisation based in Singapore, which stewards the world-renowned Mandai Wildlife Reserve at Mandai in Singapore, an integrated nature and wildlife destination home to the country's flagship wildlife parks, namely Singapore Zoo, Night Safari, River Wonders, Bird Paradise and Rainforest Wild. It is also home to the destination's newest indoor attraction Curiosity Cove, Asia's first outdoor adventure programme ZooSchool, and Mandai Rainforest Resort by Banyan Tree—Banyan Group's 100th property and its first resort in Singapore.

Logo of Wildlife Reserves Singapore before its rebranding.

Founded as Wildlife Reserves Singapore in 2000, Wildlife Reserves Singapore was renamed to Mandai Wildlife Group as part of a corporate brand refresh on 13 October 2021. In addition, River Safari was renamed River Wonders, while the Jurong Bird Park was relocated from Jurong to Mandai in 2023, and was renamed Bird Paradise.

Mandai Wildlife Group and all of its member institutions are members of the South East Asian Zoos and Aquariums Association (SEAZA). The organisation is also majority-owned by the Singapore government's investment and holding company, Temasek Holdings.

Mandai Nature is the conservation arm of Mandai Wildlife Group.
