= Mandai =

- Planning Area

Other transcription(s)
  - Malay: Mandai (Rumi) منداي (Jawi)
  - Chinese: 万礼 (Simplified) 萬禮 (Traditional); Wànlǐ (Pinyin); Bān-lé (Hokkien POJ)
  - Tamil: மண்டாய் Maṇṭāy (Transliteration)
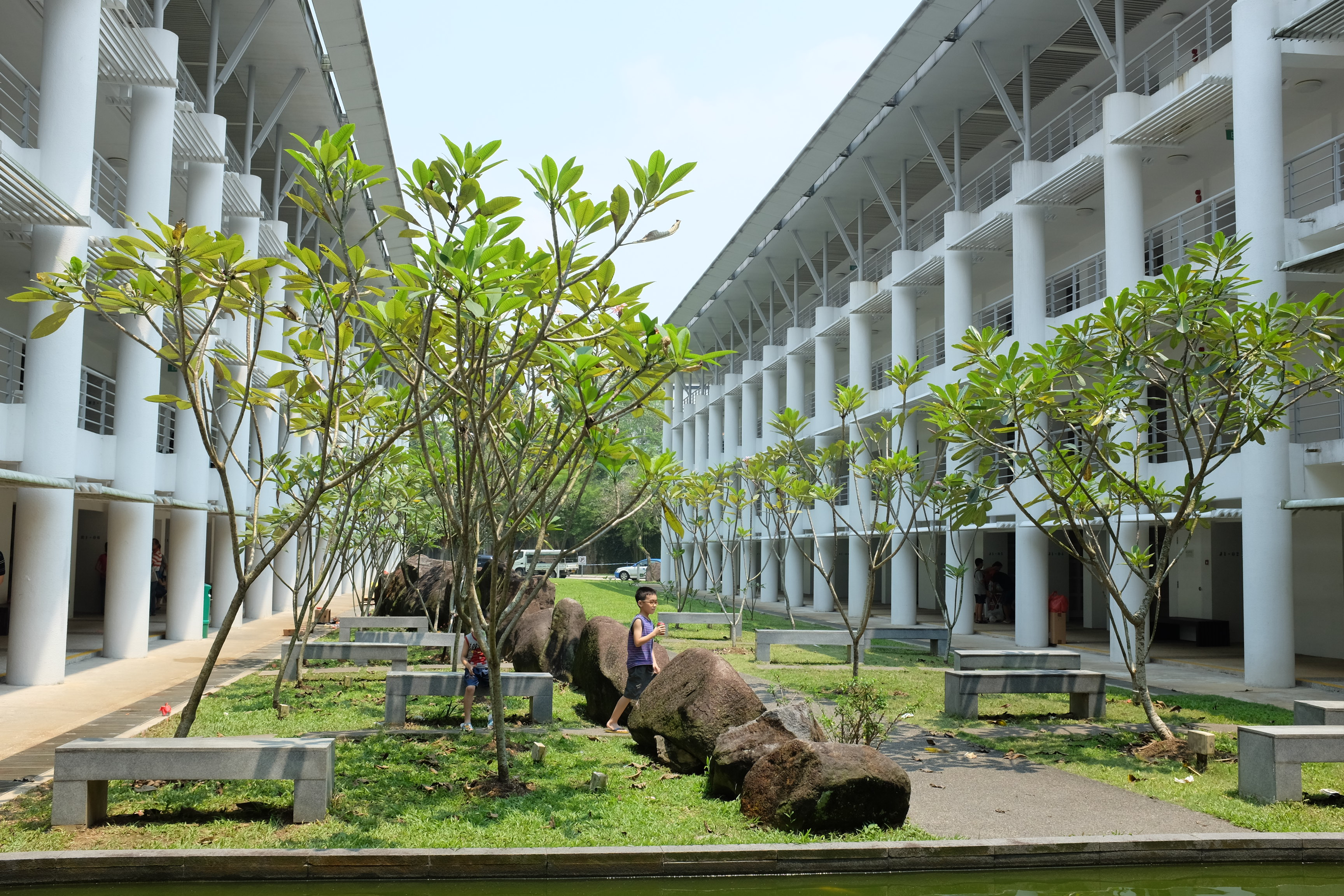
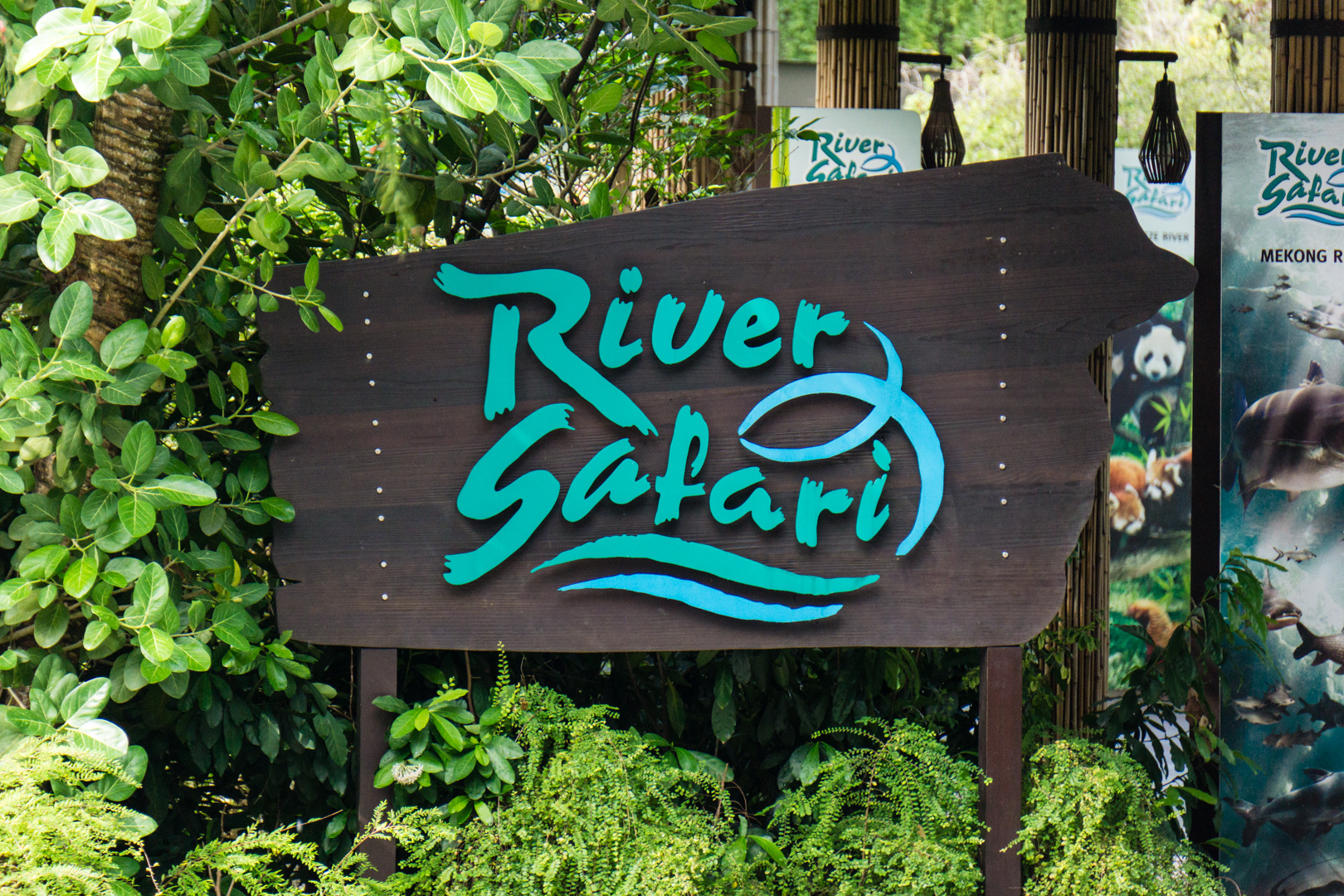
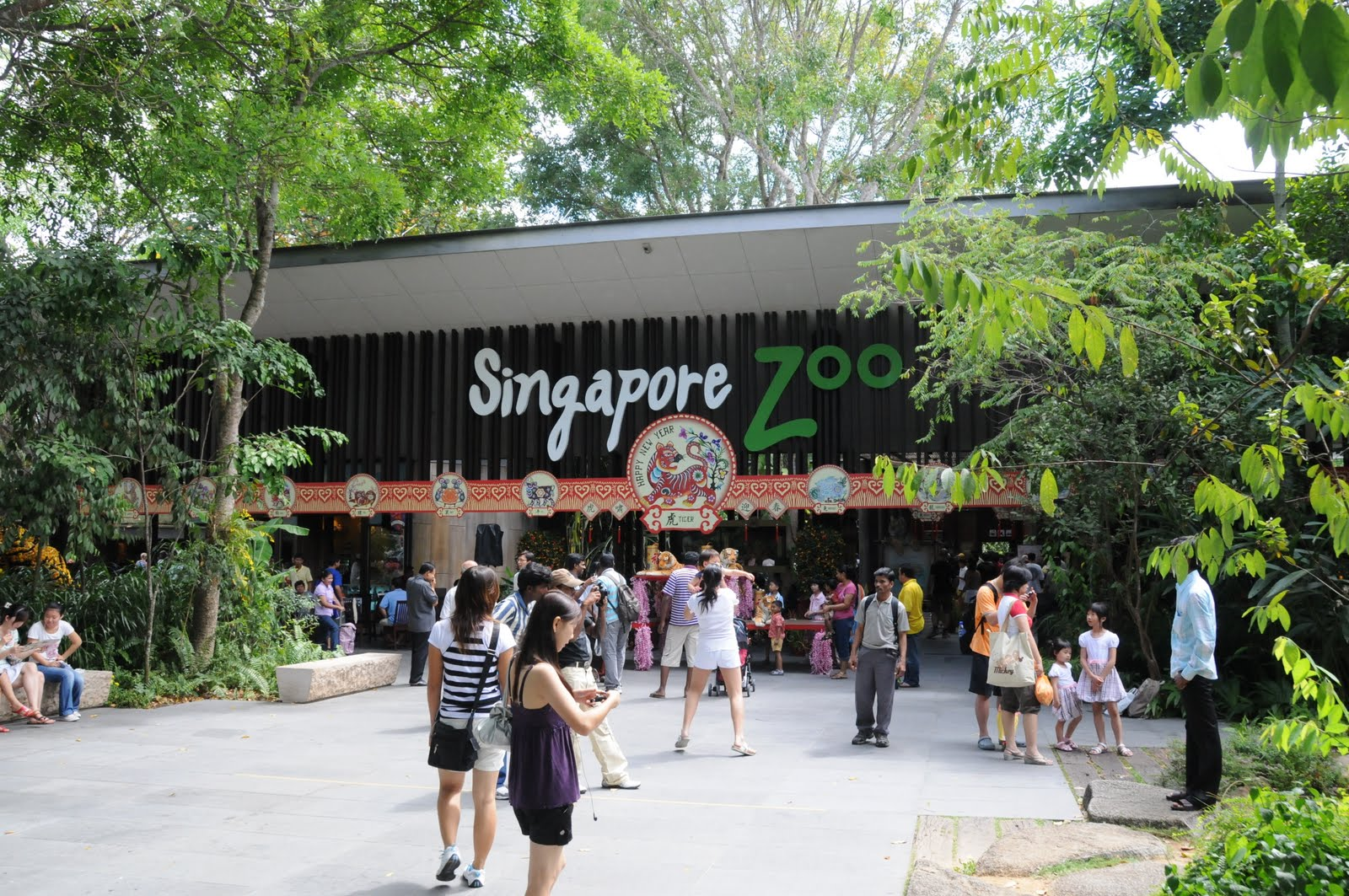
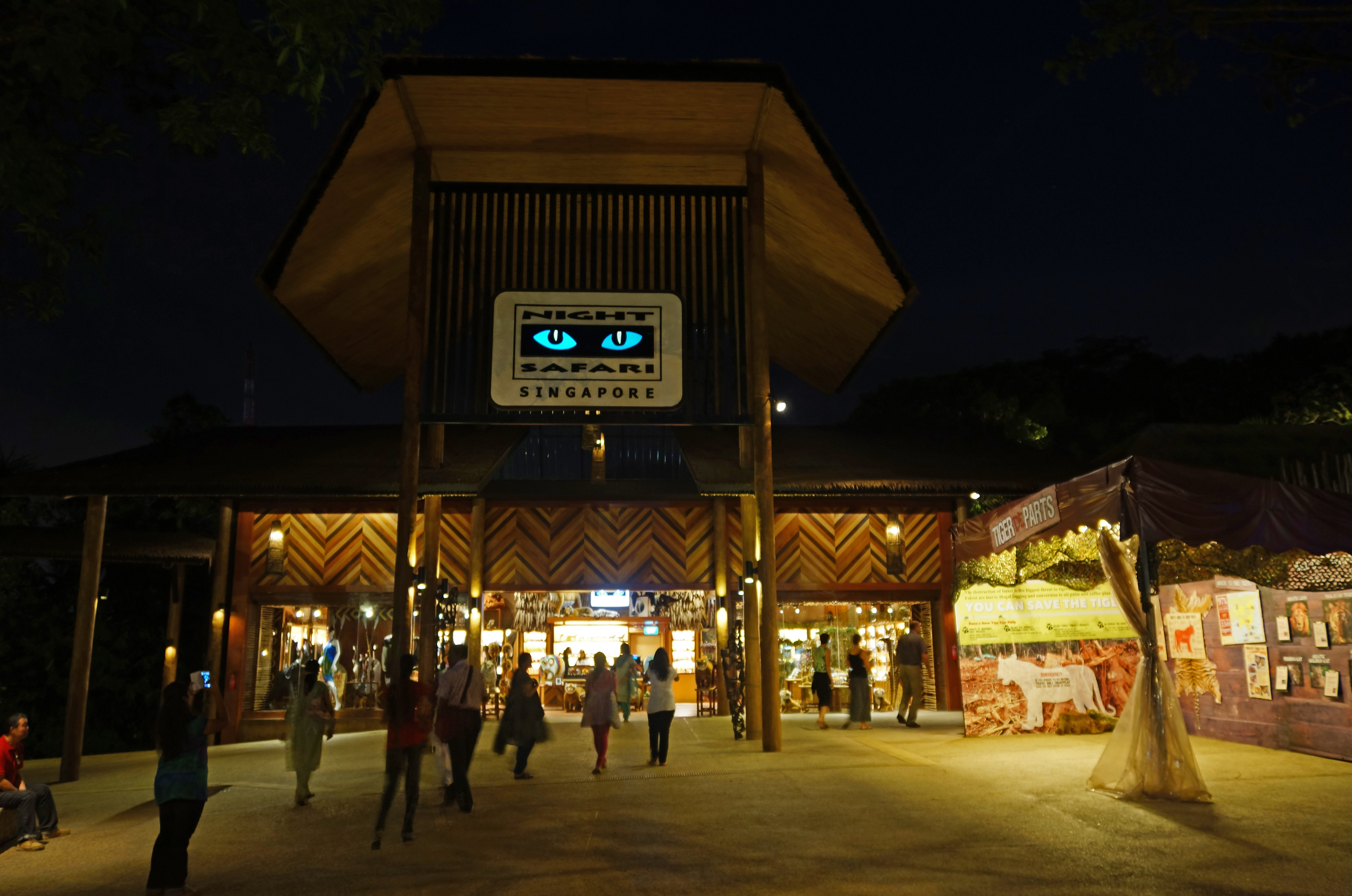
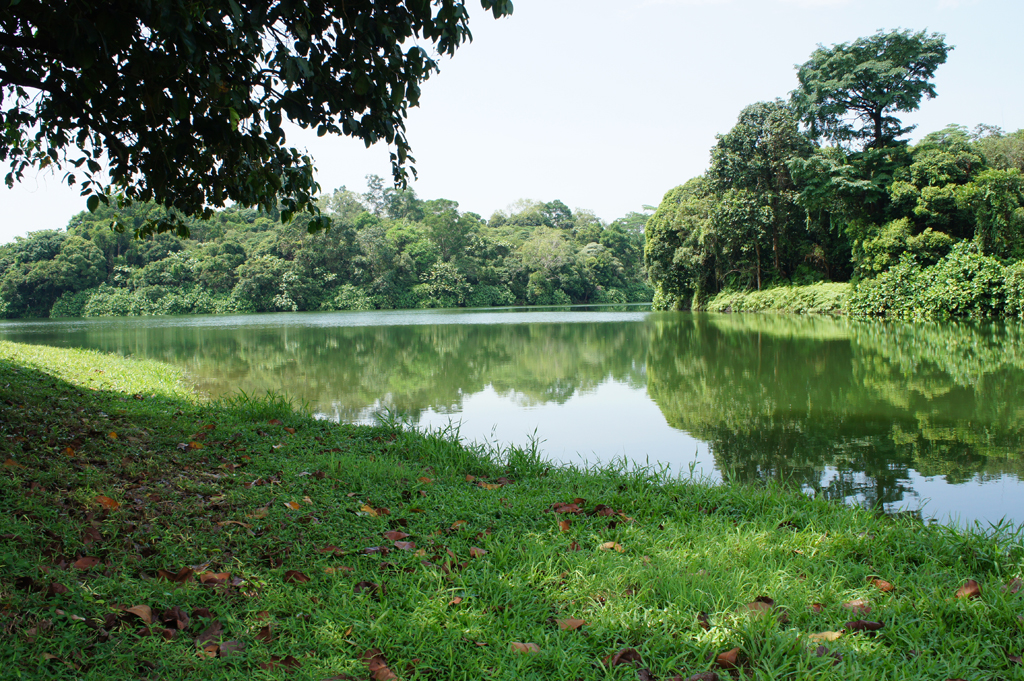
- From top left to right: Mandai Crematorium and Columbarium, River Safari, Singapore Zoo, Night Safari, Upper Seletar Reservoir

- Location of Mandai in Singapore

- Location of Mandai within Singapore
- Coordinates: 1°24′42″N 103°47′11″E
- Country: Singapore
- Region: North Region
- CDC: North West CDC
- Town councils: Marsiling-Yew Tee Town Council; Nee Soon Town Council
- Constituency: Marsiling-Yew Tee GRC; Nee Soon GRC

Government
  - Mayor: North West CDC: Alex Yam
  - Members of Parliament: Marsiling-Yew Tee GRC: Hany Soh; Nee Soon GRC: K. Shanmugam

Area
  - Total: 11.8 km^{2} (4.6 sq mi)
  - Rank: 23rd

Population (2026)
  - Total: 2,030
  - Rank: 36th
  - Density: 172/km^{2} (446/sq mi)
  - Rank: 38th
- Demonym: Official: Mandai resident
- Postal district: 25

Mandai (/ˈmɑːndaɪ/ MAHN-dye) is a planning area located in the North Region of Singapore, famously known for being the access point to the Mandai Wildlife Reserve which includes the Singapore Zoo, Night Safari, River Wonders, Bird Paradise and Rainforest Wild.

Mandai is split into three subzones for statistical and planning purposes: Mandai East and Mandai West, plus Mandai Estate.

== Etymology and history ==
Mandai Road was cut in 1855. The name Mandai appears in the Franklin and Jackson Plan of Singapore (1828) as a river indicated as "R. Mandi". There was also a reference of a hill called Bukit Mandai which appears as “Bt. Mandai” in the olden maps. The name is said to come from a Malay tree called "pokok Mandai". Others suggest that “Mandai” might be a corruption of mandi, meaning “bathe” in Malay, as the river could have been used for this purpose.The name could have been derived from the district of Mandai in South Sulawesi, Indonesia, as there is a Bugis community in Singapore.

== Other facilities ==
The Mandai Crematorium and Columbarium, the largest crematorium and columbarium in Singapore, is also located in Mandai planning area. Other features include the Sembawang Hot Springs and Sembawang Golf Course.
