= Bird Paradise =

Zoo situated in Mandai, Singapore

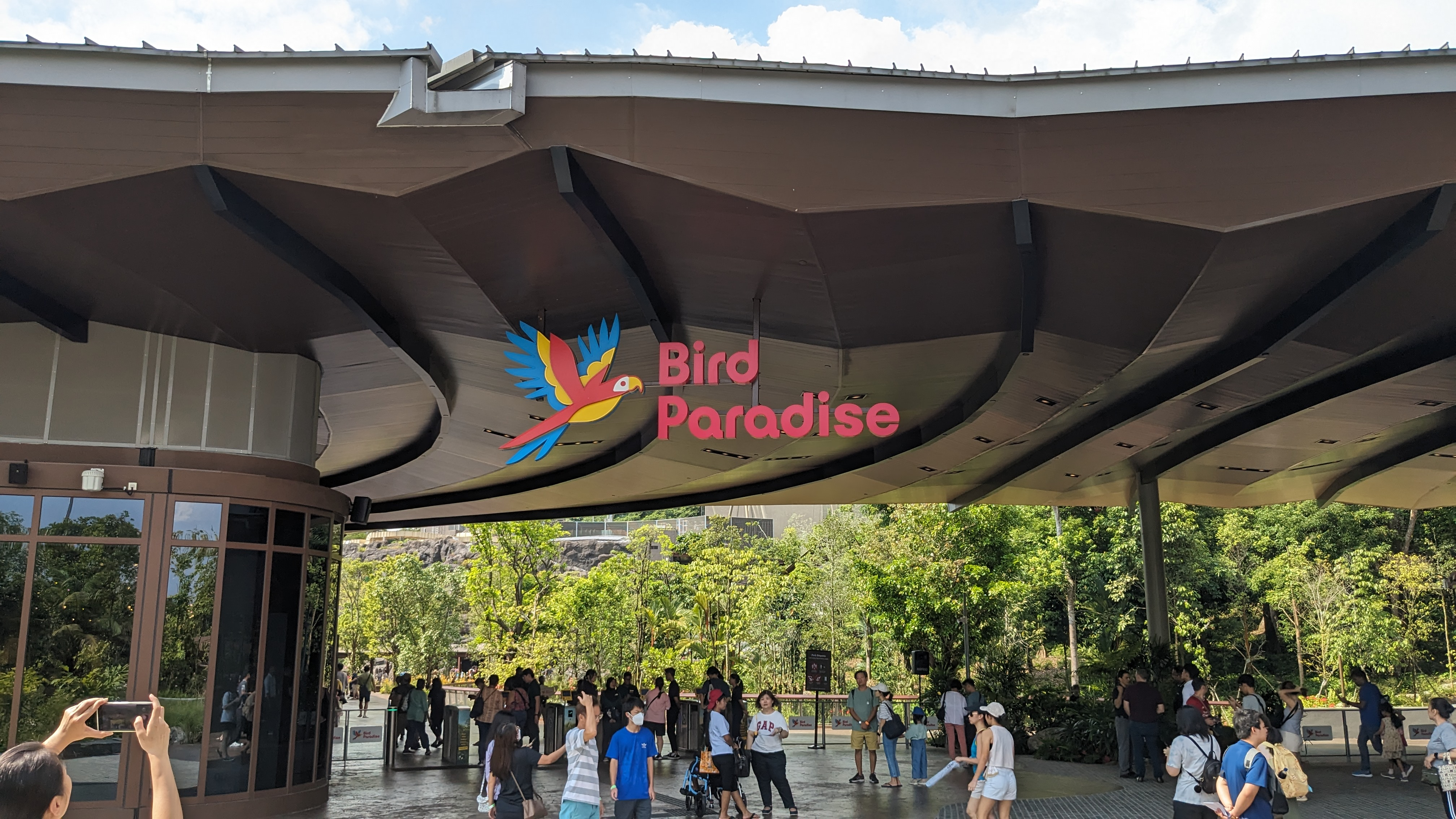
- Interactive map of Bird Paradise
- 1°24′25″N 103°46′52″E
- Date opened: 8 May 2023; 3 years ago (soft opening); 15 November 2023; 3 years ago (grand opening)
- Location: Mandai, Singapore; 20 Mandai Lake Road, Singapore 729825
- Land area: 17 ha (42 acres)
- No. of animals: 3,500
- No. of species: 400
- Public transit: 138 (Note: via TE4 Springleaf and NS16 CR11 Ang Mo Kio); 927 (Note: via NS4 JS1 BP1 Choa Chu Kang)
- Website: www.mandai.com/en/bird-paradise.html

Bird Paradise is an aviary located in Mandai, Singapore. Opened on 8 May 2023, it replaced the Jurong Bird Park and forms a part of the Mandai Wildlife Reserve, which also comprises the Singapore Zoo, Night Safari, River Wonders and the Rainforest Wild ASIA. Bird Paradise covers approximately 17 hectares (42 acres), with larger and double the walk-in aviaries than the previous Jurong Bird Park. The aviary was designed by Singaporean architectural firm, RSP Architects Planners & Engineers.

== History ==
In 2016, the Mandai Wildlife Group announced that Jurong Bird Park would be closed and the entire collection would be relocated to a different, similarly sized park at Mandai Lake Road by 2020. This would result in the consolidation of the three existing Singapore wildlife parks with the new Rainforest Wild, and form a fully-integrated nature and wildlife district, collectively referred to as the Mandai Wildlife Reserve.

In 2021, the group announced that the park's successor in Mandai would be named Bird Paradise. It was also announced that the park's grand opening would be slightly delayed due to challenging construction site conditions, and the ongoing impact of the tapering COVID-19 pandemic.

In 2022, it was announced that Jurong Bird Park would be closed on 3 January 2023, in an effort to accelerate the relocation to Bird Paradise, Mandai.

Bird Paradise officially opened to the general public on 8 May 2023, with ticket pre-sales commencing on 24 April 2023.

== Animals and exhibits ==
=== Ocean Network Express Penguin Cove ===
Penguin Cove is one of the world's largest simulated Antarctic exhibits. Featuring cold saltwater pools for king, gentoo and northern rockhopper penguins, the exhibit simulates conditions near the South Pole. The building consists of two levels, one for observing the birds whilst swimming (via underwater viewing galleries), and another above the water level simulating a windswept, cold beach for the birds to roost and nest on. The exhibit utilises specially-timed lighting systems for the birds' well-being, intending to replicate the 24-hour summer daylight of the poles, or, depending on the time of year, the 24-hours of darkness (polar winter). This exhibit has earned the Platinum BCA Green Mark Award for green innovation.

=== Winged Sanctuary ===
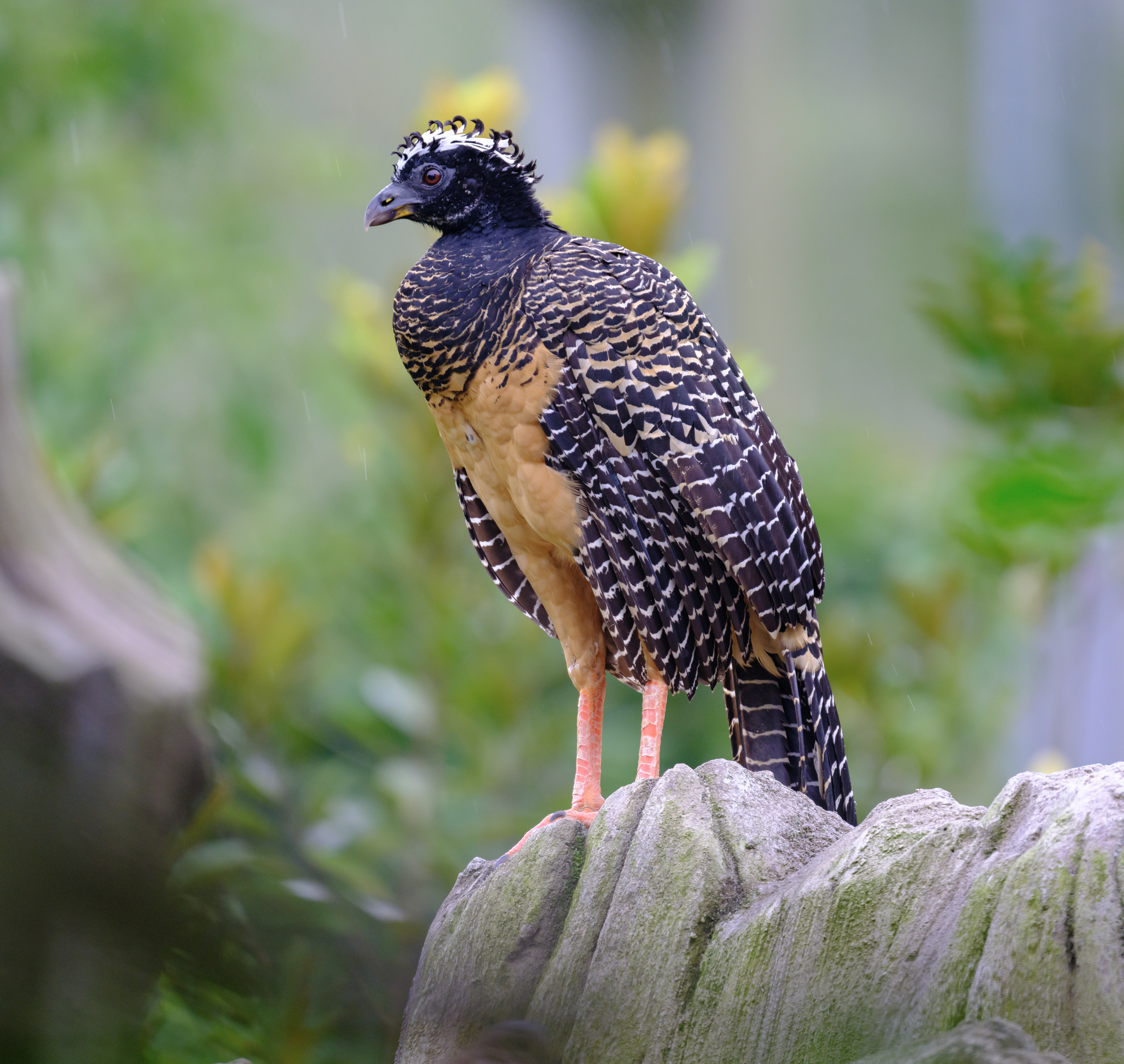
Bare-Faced Curassow

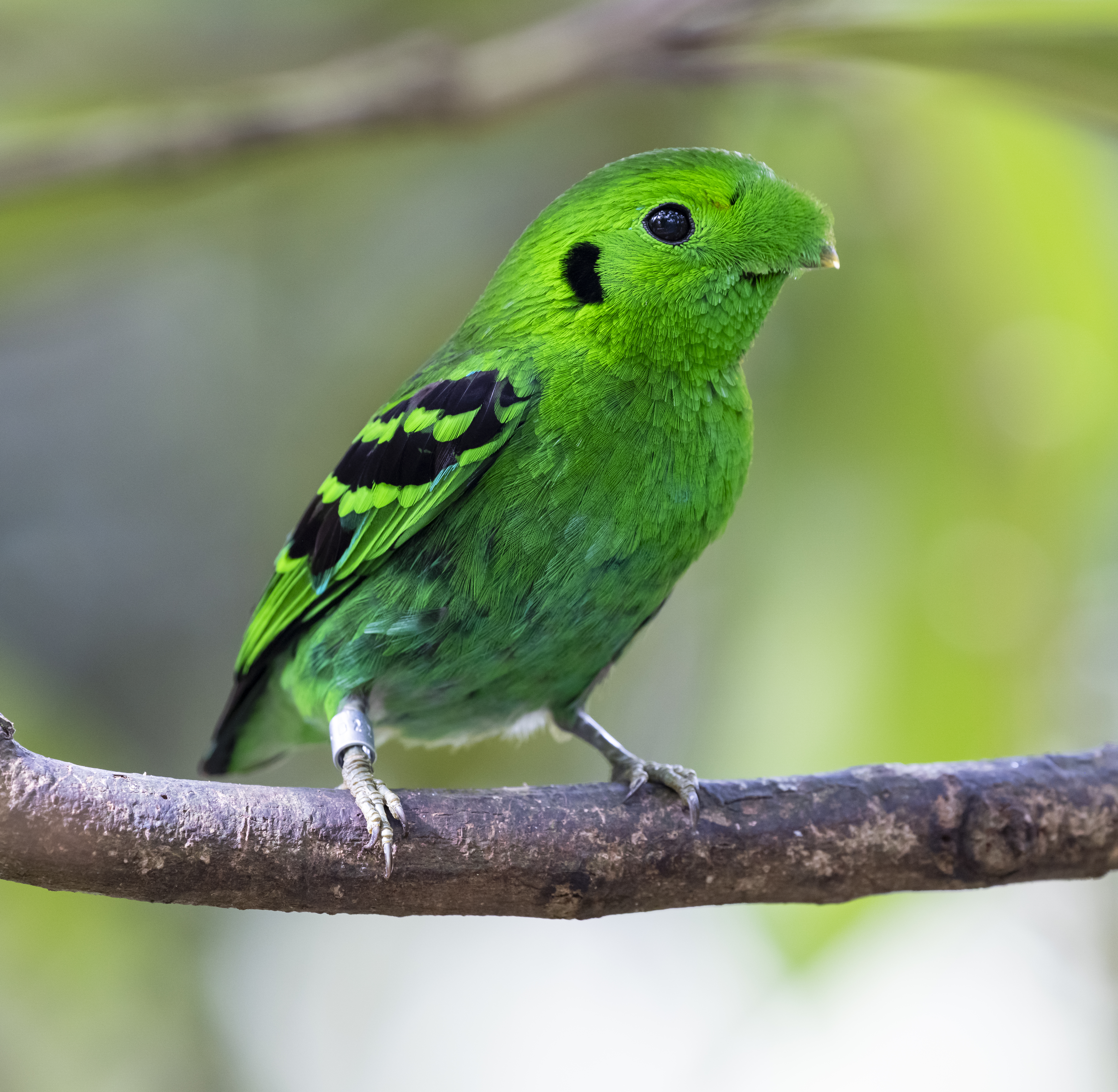
Green Broadbill

The Winged Sanctuary houses the park's collection of over 20 species of hornbills and other endangered tropical birds, such as the Palawan peacock-pheasant and the Philippine eagle (also known as the monkey-eating eagle). The area consists of tall and densely-planted steel-mesh screen aviaries.

Species include:

- Abyssinian ground-hornbill
- African grey hornbill
- Bare-faced curassow
- Black hornbill
- Chestnut-eared aracari
- Eastern crested guineafowl
- Edward's pheasant
- Great pied hornbill
- Guianan cock-of-the-rock
- King bird-of-paradise
- Knobbed hornbill
- Luzon hornbill
- Malayan crested fireback
- Mountain peacock-pheasant
- Oriental pied hornbill
- Philippine eagle
- Piping hornbill
- Raggiana bird-of-paradise
- Red-billed toucan
- Rhinoceros hornbilll
- Silvery-cheeked hornbill
- Southern ground-hornbill
- Trumpeter hornbill
- Twelve-wired bird-of-paradise
- White-crowned hornbill
- Wreathed hornbill

=== Shaw Foundation Australian Outback ===
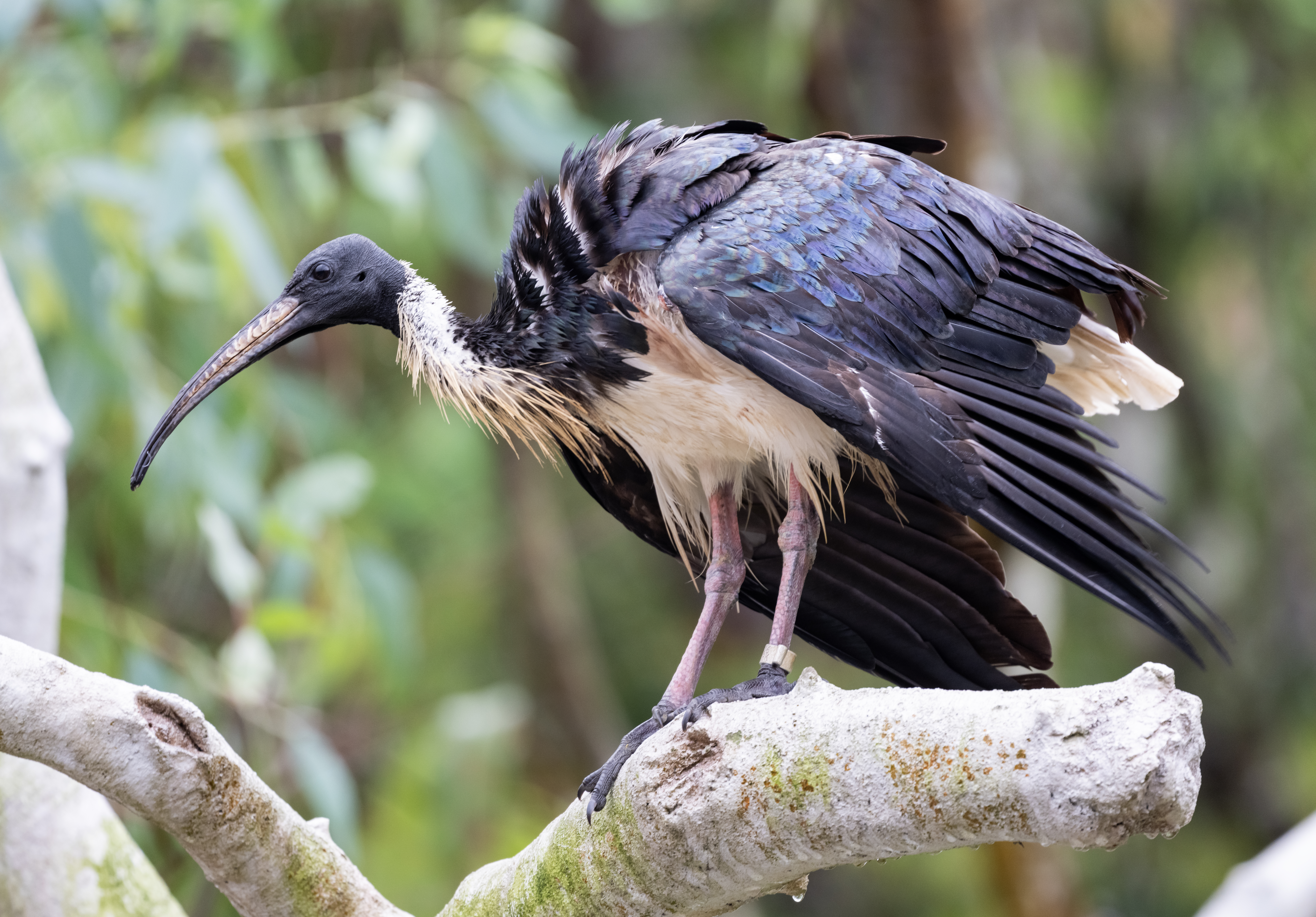
Straw-Necked Ibis

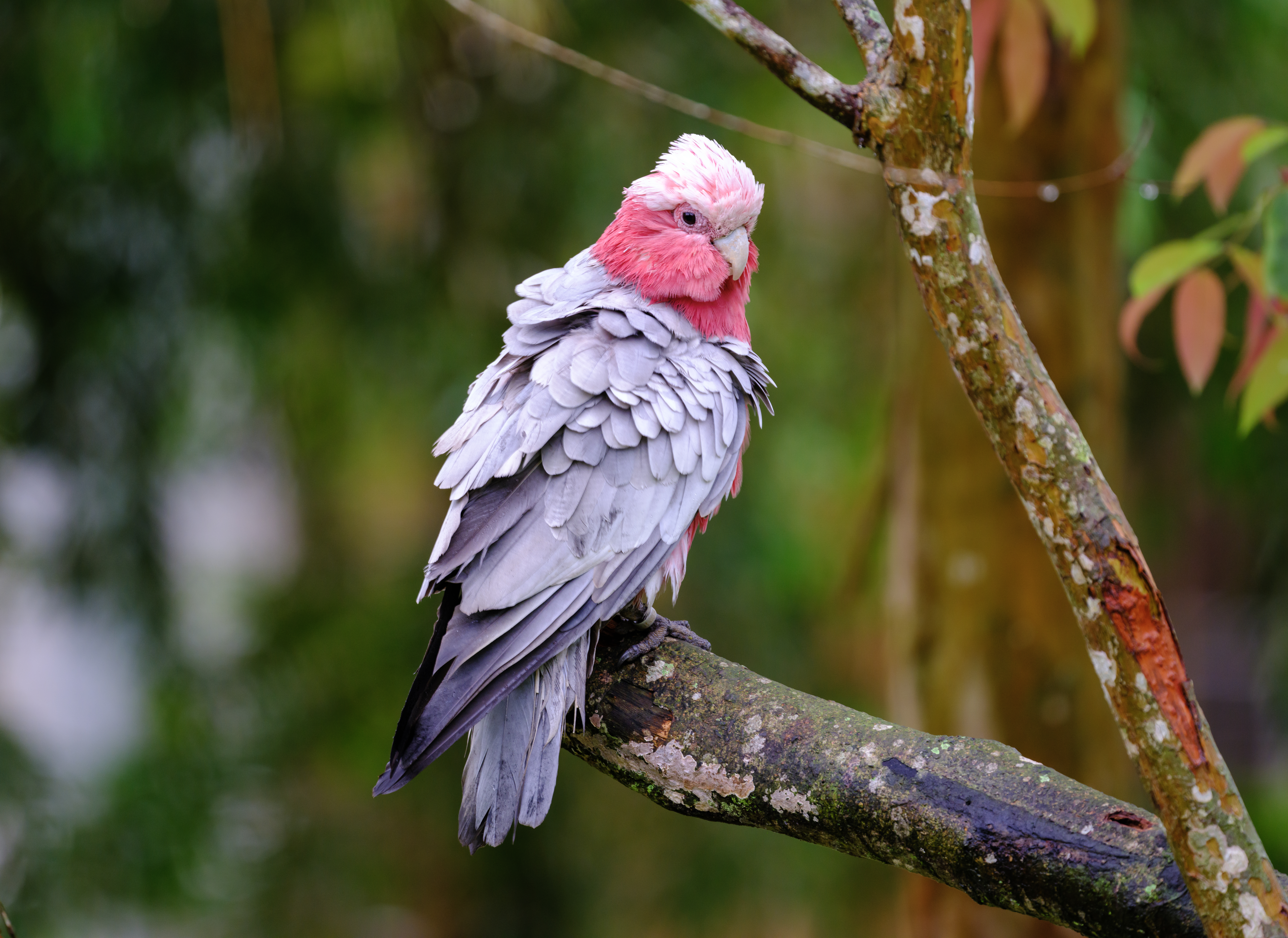
Galah

The Shaw Foundation Australian Outback mimics the semi-arid environment of the Australian outback, as well as semi-tropical portions of Papua New Guinea and Northeastern Australia. The landscaping consists primarily of eucalyptus and ficus trees, termite mounds and Aboriginal cave paintings. In addition to the many birds, visitors may observe Bennett's (or red-necked) wallabies here.

Species of interest are:

- Australian king parrot
- Australian wood duck
- Blue-faced honeyeater
- Common emu
- Galah
- Laughing kookaburra
- Magpie goose
- Major Mitchell's cockatoo
- Papuan eclectus
- Red-collared lorikeet
- Red-necked wallaby
- Red-tailed black cockatoo
- Scaly-breasted lorikeet
- Tawny frogmouth

=== Mysterious Papua ===
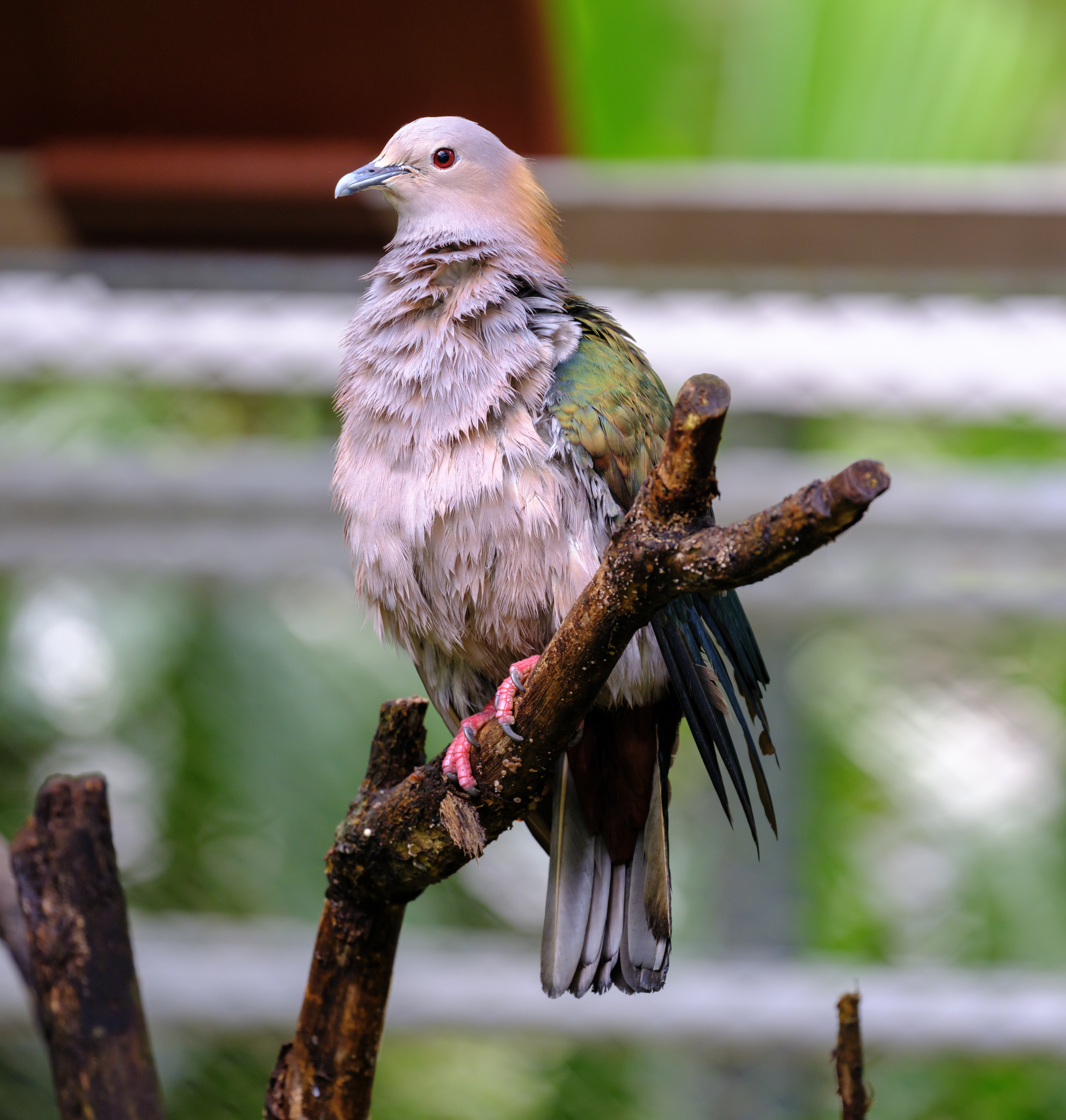
Green Imperial Pigeon

This unique aviary replicates the coastal, tropical forests of Papua New Guinea, with some species from Northern Australia and other nearby islands. Within the aviary are buildings styled after the huts of the Papuan Korowai people, and viewing galleries inspired by Sepik houses.

Species inside include:

- Blue-winged kookaburra
- Coconut lorikeet
- Lesser bird-of-paradise
- Metallic starling
- Nicobar pigeon
- Ornate lorikeet
- Palm cockatoo
- Pacific imperial pigeon
- Sclater's crowned pigeon
- Silver-tipped imperial pigeon
- Southern cassowary
- Sumba eclectus

=== Lory Loft ===
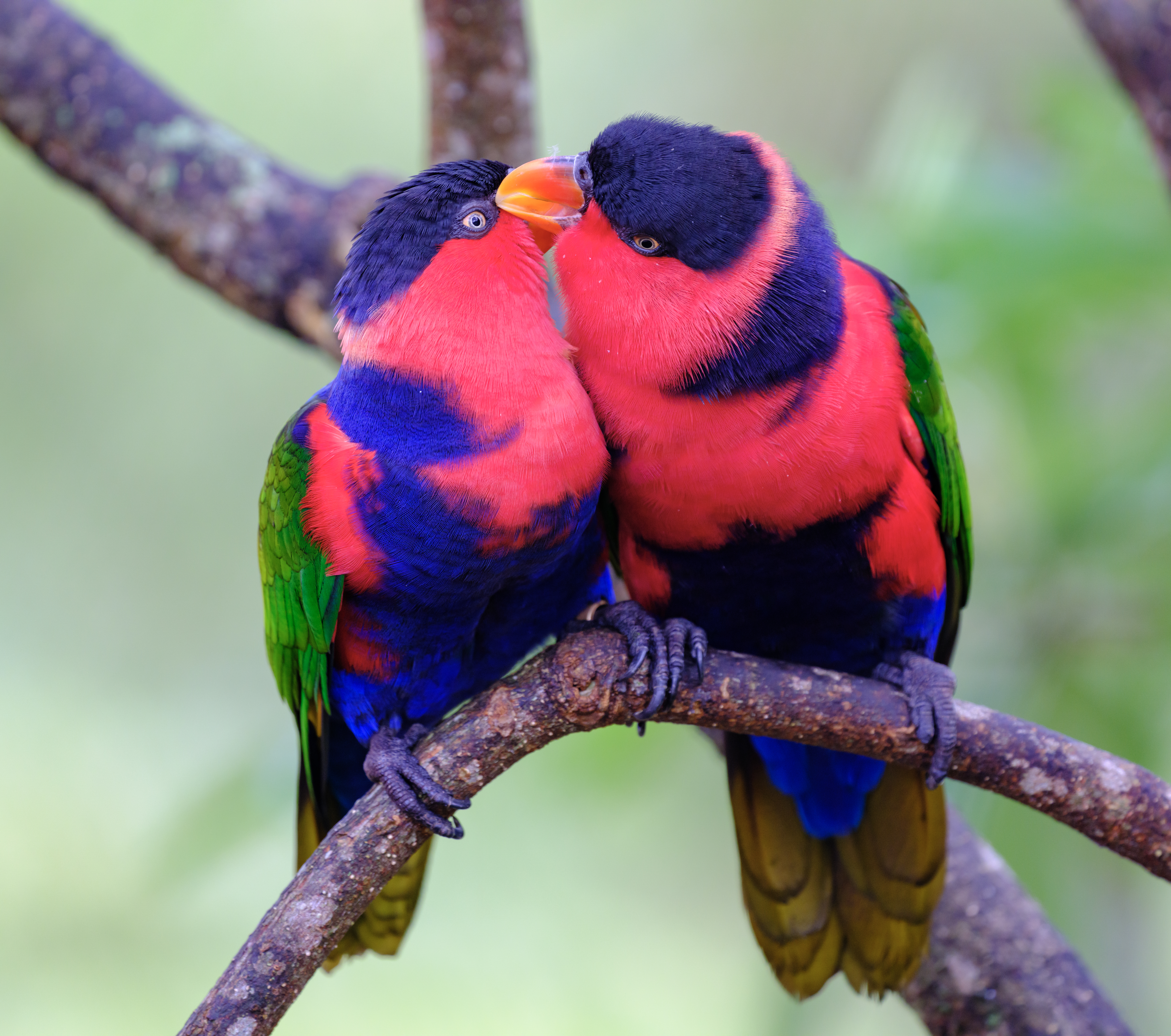
Black-Capped Lory

This is a continuation of an aviary of the same name at the former Jurong Bird Park, housing many species of psittaciformes. Notably, there is a large breeding population of blue-eyed cockatoos, as well as:

- Black-capped lory
- Brown lory
- Chattering lory
- Coconut lorikeet
- Dusky lory
- Luzon hornbill
- Northern cassowary
- Marigold lorikeet
- Purple-bellied lory
- Purple-naped lory
- Red-collared lorikeet
- Red lory
- Tanimbar corella
- Western crowned pigeon
- White cockatoo
- Yellow-bibbed lory
- Yellow-crested cockatoo

=== Amazonian Jewels ===
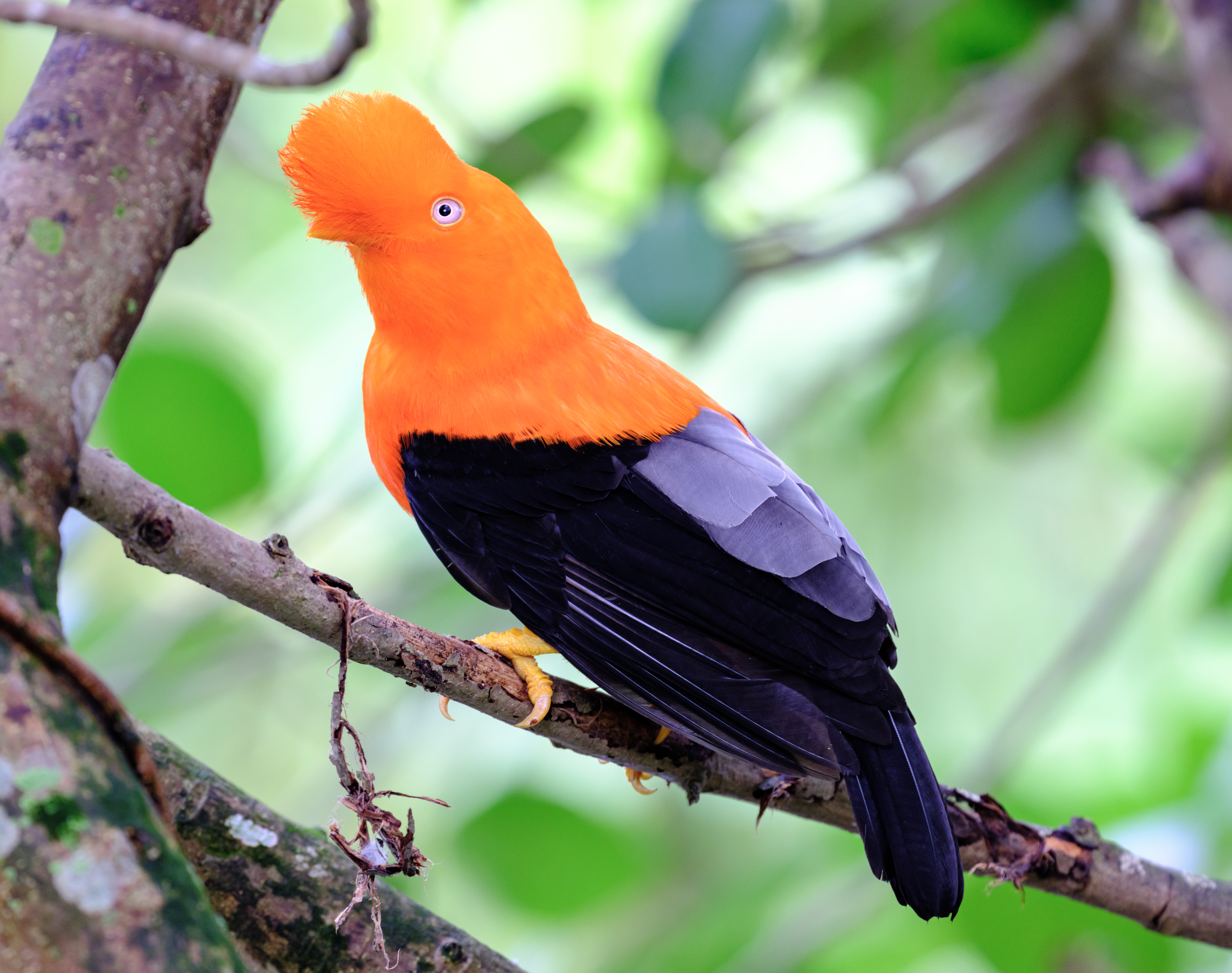
Andean Cock-of-the-Rock

Amazonian Jewels is a lushly-planted aviary replicating the rainforests of Central and South America and the Caribbean, featuring species such as cracids, curassows, toucans, and oropendolas. There is also a viewing area resembling a large tree stump, as well as numerous New World aroids and bromeliads planted throughout. Species of interest are:

- Amazonian motmot
- Andean cock-of-the-rock
- Bare-faced curassow
- Blue-crowned parakeet
- Blue ground dove
- Capuchinbird
- Crimson-bellied parakeet
- Eared dove
- Golden parakeet
- Green oropendola
- Green-cheeked amazon
- Helmeted curassow
- Jandaya parakeet
- Linnaeus's two-toed sloth
- Moriche oriole
- Pompadour cotinga
- Red-crested cardinal
- Red-fan parrot
- Saffron toucanet
- White-crowned pigeon

=== Songs of the Forest ===
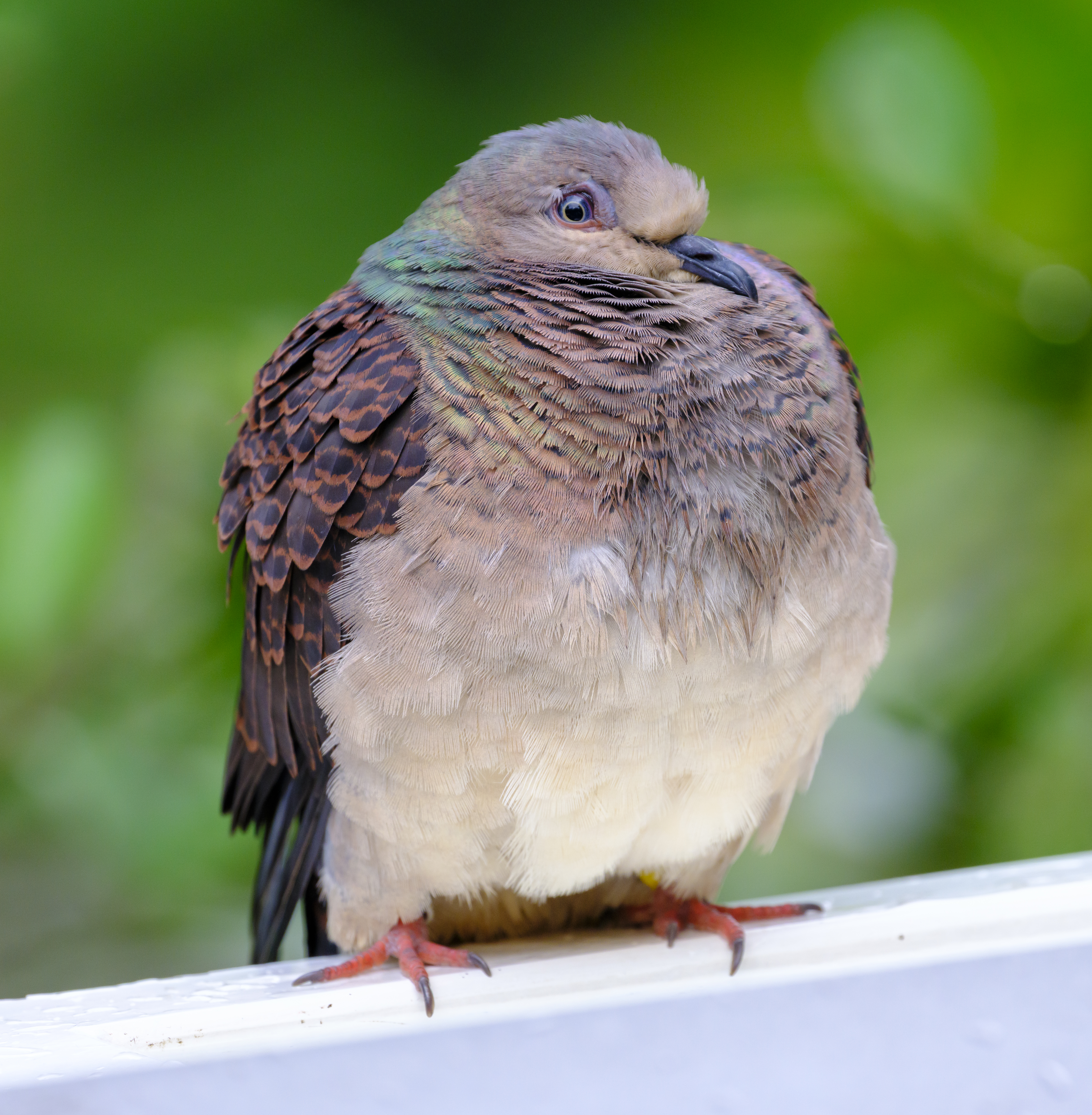
Barred Cuckoo-Dove

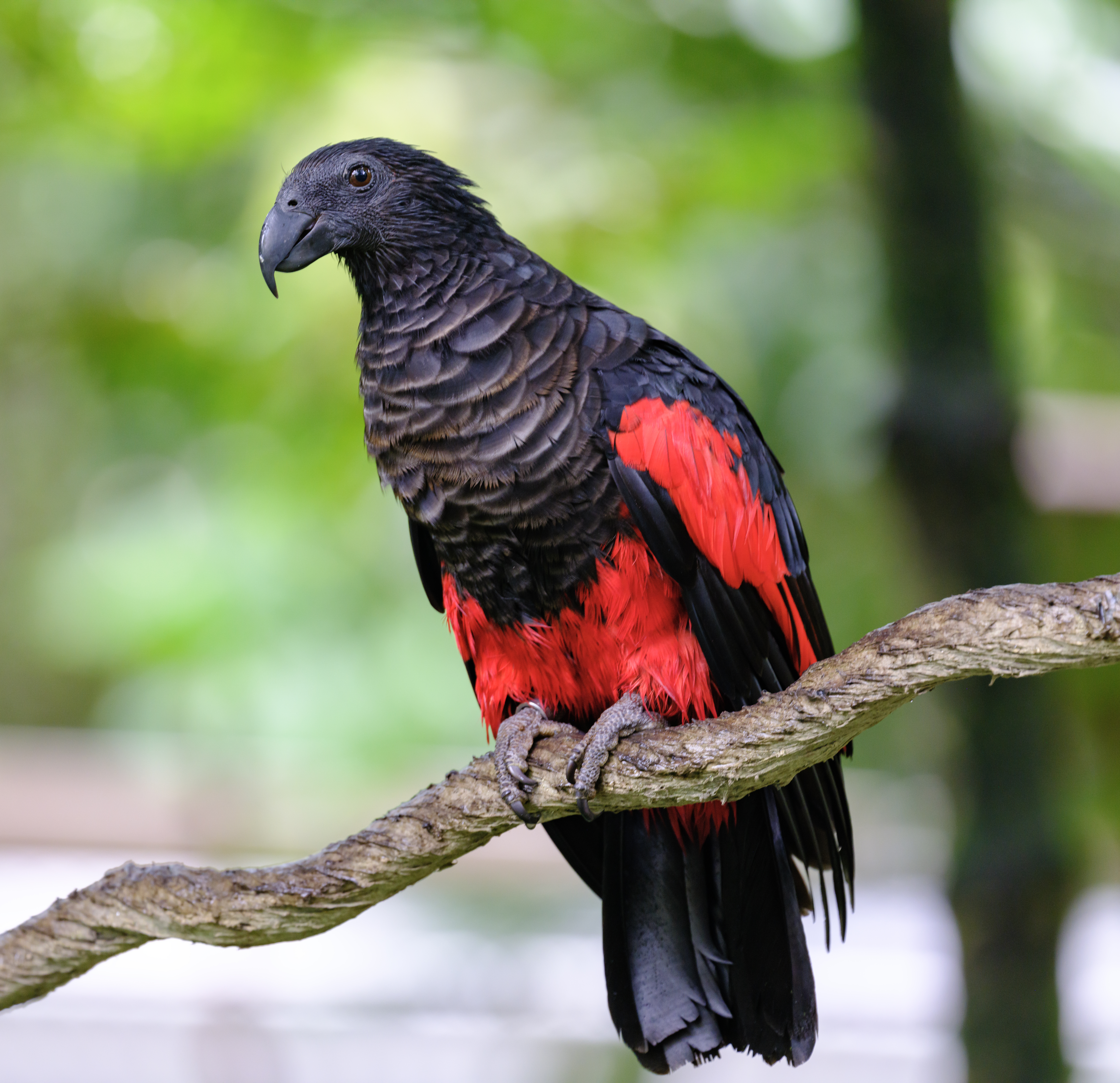
Pesquet's Parrot

Songs of the Forest features vulnerable, threatened and endangered songbirds (among other species) of Southeast Asia, such as the straw-headed bulbul, Bali myna and the fairy bluebird. The exhibit shines a spotlight on the global black market trade of endangered birds, an issue which requires urgent attention. Species of interest are:

- Asian fairy-bluebird
- Bali myna
- Barred cuckoo-dove
- Black-winged myna
- Brahminy starling
- Coleto
- Crested partridge
- Golden-crested myna
- Greater green leafbird
- Javan pied starling
- Luzon bleeding-heart
- Mountain bamboo partridge
- Pesquet's parrot
- Red-vented bulbul
- Red-whiskered bulbul
- Santa Cruz ground dove
- Sri Lankan junglefowl
- Straw-headed bulbul
- Sumba eclectus
- Victoria crowned pigeon
- White-throated laughingthrush
- White-rumped shama

=== Hong Leong Foundation Crimson Wetlands ===
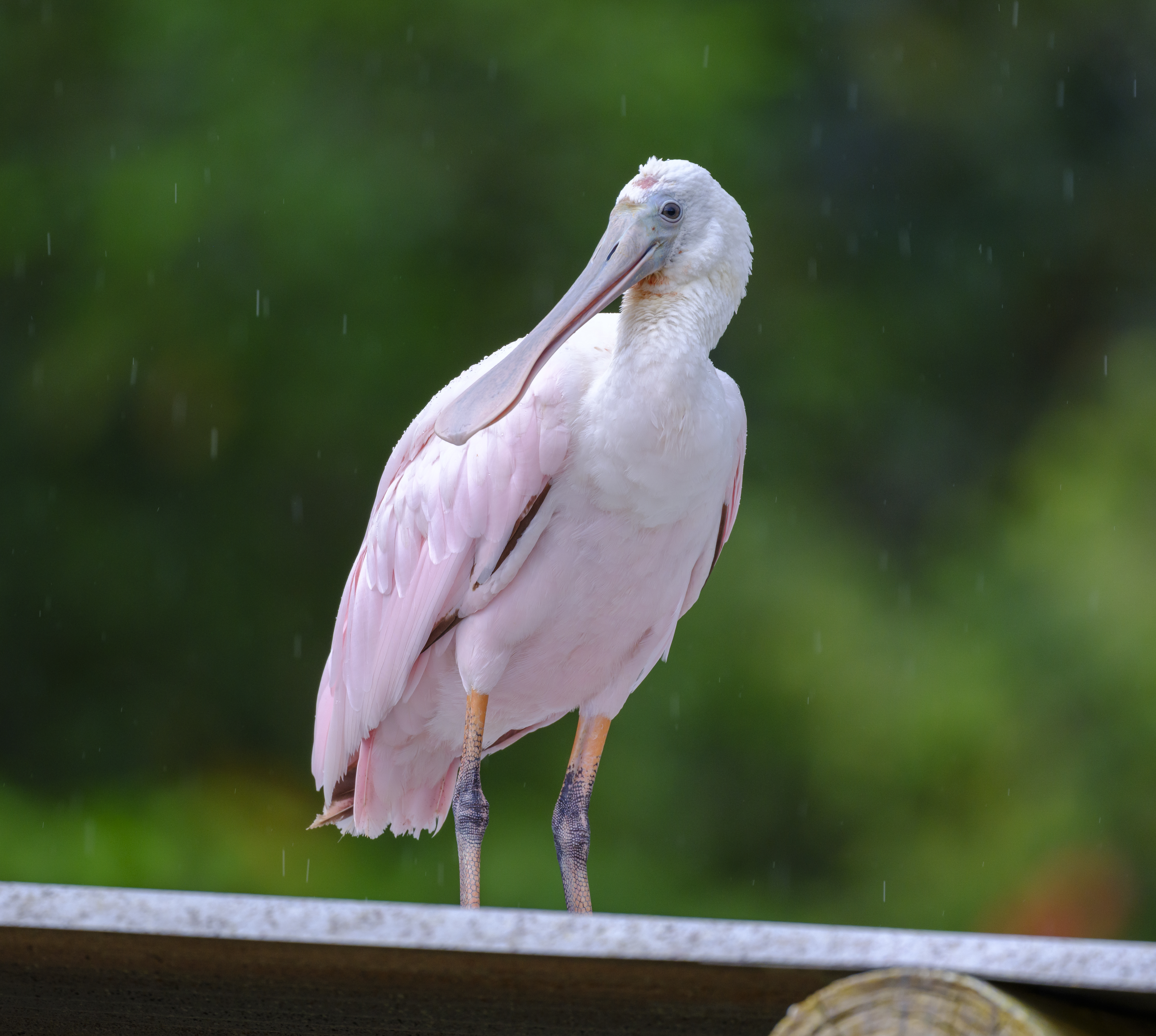
Roseate Spoonbill

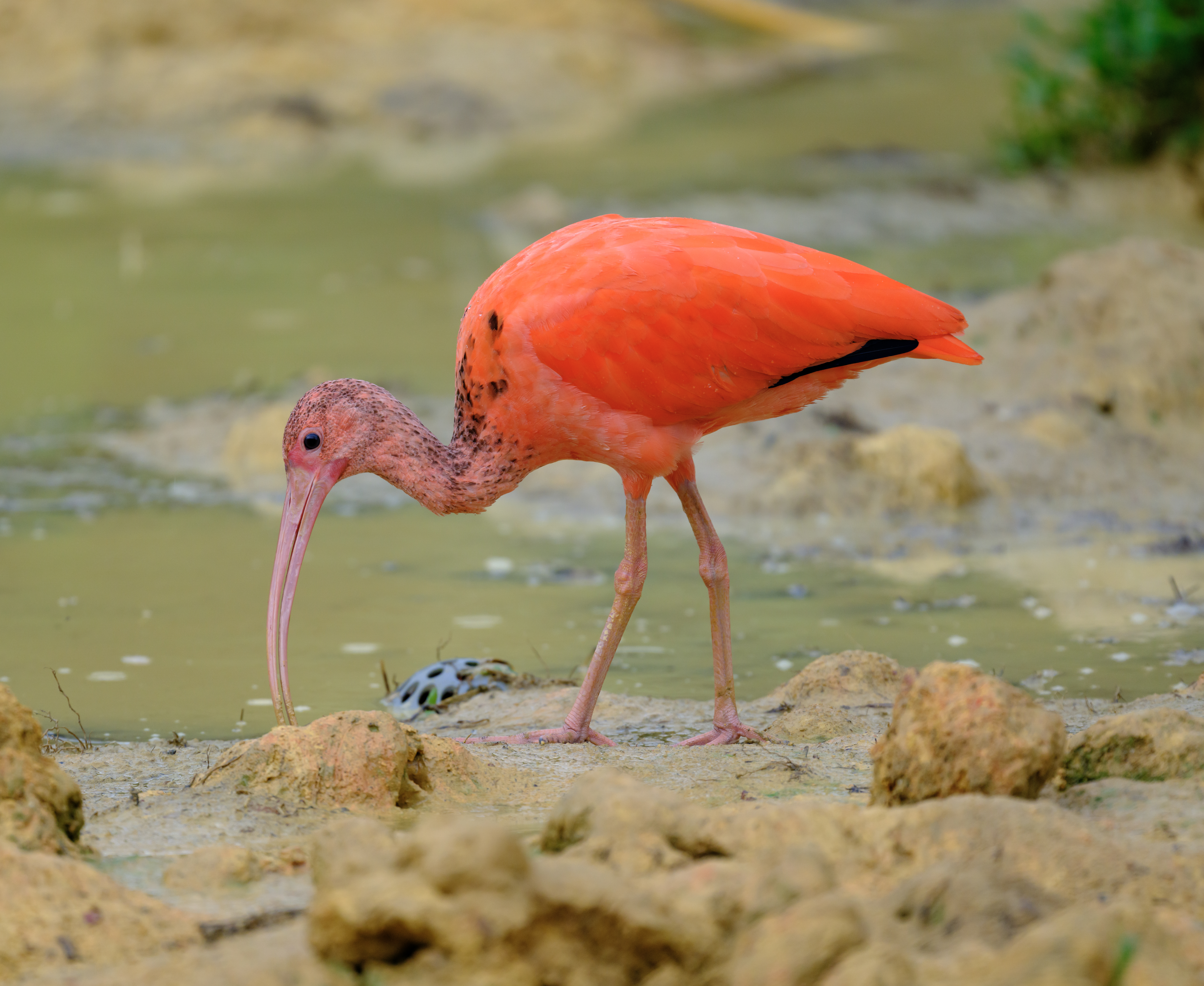
Scarlet Ibis

Crimson Wetlands recreates the wetland habitats of South America and the Caribbean. Its main attraction is a very large pool with a plunging waterfall, overlooking a lake for the park's flock of American flamingoes, along with typical New World waterbirds such as the roseate spoonbill and scarlet ibis (the national bird of Trinidad and Tobago), as well as turtles of South America. There is a simulated clay wall where various parrots gather to nest and extract nutrients by chewing the clay, as a form of mineral lick. Species include:

- American flamingo
- Blue-throated macaw
- Blue-winged macaw
- Boat-billed heron
- Burrowing parrot
- Brazilian teal
- Chestnut-fronted macaw
- Cinnamon teal
- Coscoroba swan
- Great green macaw
- Hyacinth macaw
- Lilac-crowned amazon
- Military macaw
- Muscovy duck
- Northern red-shouldered macaw
- Red-and-green macaw
- Red-bellied macaw
- Red-fronted macaw
- Ringed teal
- Roseate spoonbill
- Scarlet ibis
- Scarlet macaw
- Sun parakeet
- White-fronted amazon
- Yellow-spotted river turtle

=== Kuok Group Wings of Asia ===
Nankeen Night Heron

This aviary replicates a Balinese or Indonesian landscape, with dense trees, bamboo and simulated rice terraces. There are elevated walkways where visitors can experience the aviary via two different levels.

Species include:

- Australian pelican
- Bar-headed goose
- Black-faced spoonbill
- Blyth's hornbill
- Common hill myna
- Falcated duck
- Germain's peacock-pheasant
- Greater racket-tailed drongo
- Grey junglefowl
- Grey peacock-pheasant
- Golden pheasant
- Indian pied myna
- Lesser adjutant
- Mandarin duck
- Marbled teal
- Milky stork
- Nankeen night heron
- Pied imperial pigeon
- Oriental pied hornbill (rotated for keeper talks)
- Rufous hornbill (rotated for keeper talks)

=== Rwanda Nyungwe Forest Heart of Africa ===
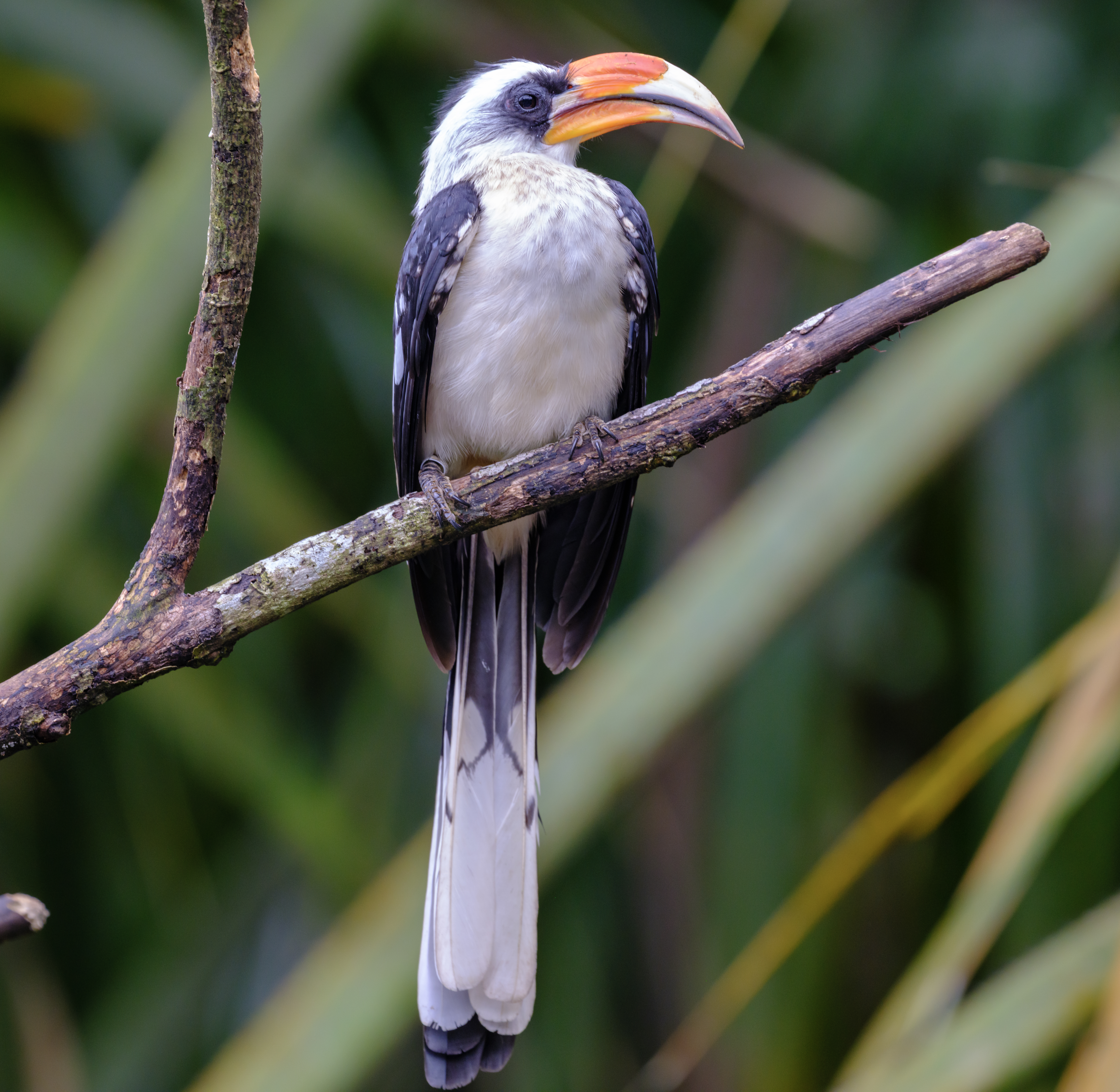
Von der Decken's Hornbill

Guinea Turaco

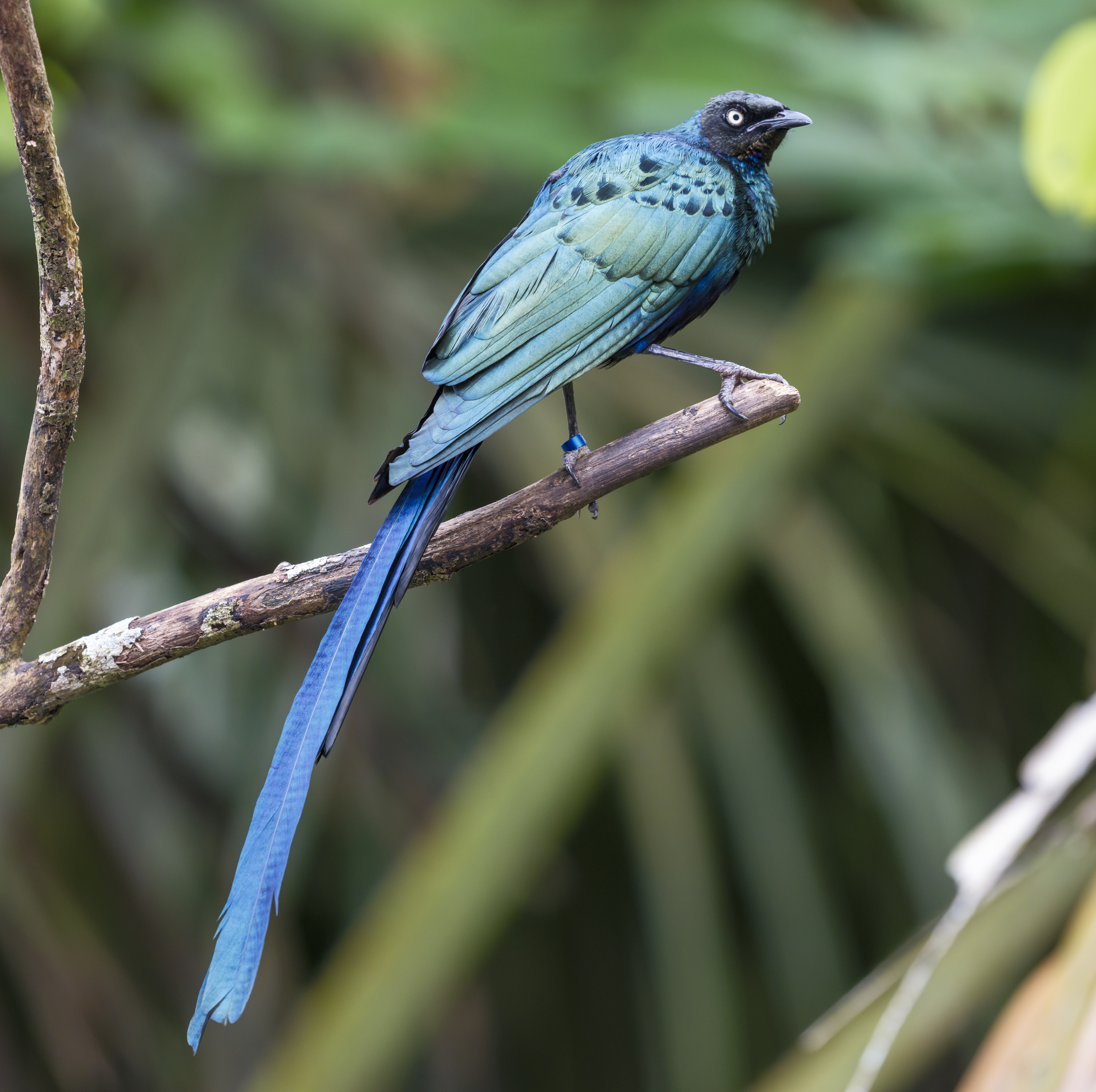
Long-Tailed Glossy Starling

Heart of Africa is the largest aviary at Bird Paradise. It was inspired by the dense Nyungwe Forest of Rwanda in East Africa. Similar to Wings of Asia, Heart of Africa has various suspension bridges and elevated walkways, enabling visitors to see birds at varied heights, from the forest floor to the treetops.

Species of interest include:

- Crowned hornbill
- Von der Decken's hornbill
- Western long-tailed hornbill
- Hamerkop
- Shoebill
- Greater flamingo
- Lesser flamingo
- Saddle-billed stork
- Black-crowned crane
- Wattled crane
- African sacred ibis
- Black-winged lovebird
- Grey parrot
- Bruce's green pigeon
- Speckled pigeon
- Laughing dove
- Northern carmine bee-eater
- Green woodhoopoe
- Guinea turaco
- Great blue turaco
- Schalow's turaco
- Crested coua
- Vieillot's barbet
- Bearded barbet
- Long-tailed glossy starling
- Superb starling
- Red-winged starling

== Presentations ==
Bird Paradise has two live presentations, Predators on Wings and Wings of the World, both of which are presented periodically throughout each day at the wildlife park's Sky Amphitheatre.

Wings of the World features many ambassador animals that were part of previous shows at the Jurong location. Some notable birds include ‘Sunny’, a great pied hornbill and the mascot of Bird Paradise (along with several other Oriental pied hornbills), ‘Amigo’ the yellow-naped amazon parrot who sings in three languages, and a 50-year-old sulphur-crested cockatoo.

Predators on Wings displays the power and might of some of the world's birds of prey. Species to look out for include the American bald eagle, Harris' hawk, the turkey vulture, and the white-bellied sea eagle.

== Transportation ==
=== Public transportation ===
Like the adjacent Singapore Zoo, Night Safari and River Wonders wildlife parks, Bird Paradise is located west of the Mandai Wildlife Reserve and has its own bus stop. There are two bus services — 138 and 927. Service 138 connects to the nearest Springleaf MRT station, as well as Ang Mo Kio MRT station, while Service 927 connects to the Choa Chu Kang MRT/LRT station. Additionally, bus service 171 stops nearby the reserve, but doesn't pass through.

=== Shuttle ===
A shuttle service, known as the Mandai Khatib Bus, plies daily between Khatib MRT station and Bird Paradise. A one-way trip costs $2.50 for everyone above the age of three.

== See also ==
- Jurong Bird Park
