= Night Safari, Singapore =

Nocturnal zoo in Singapore

Night Safari

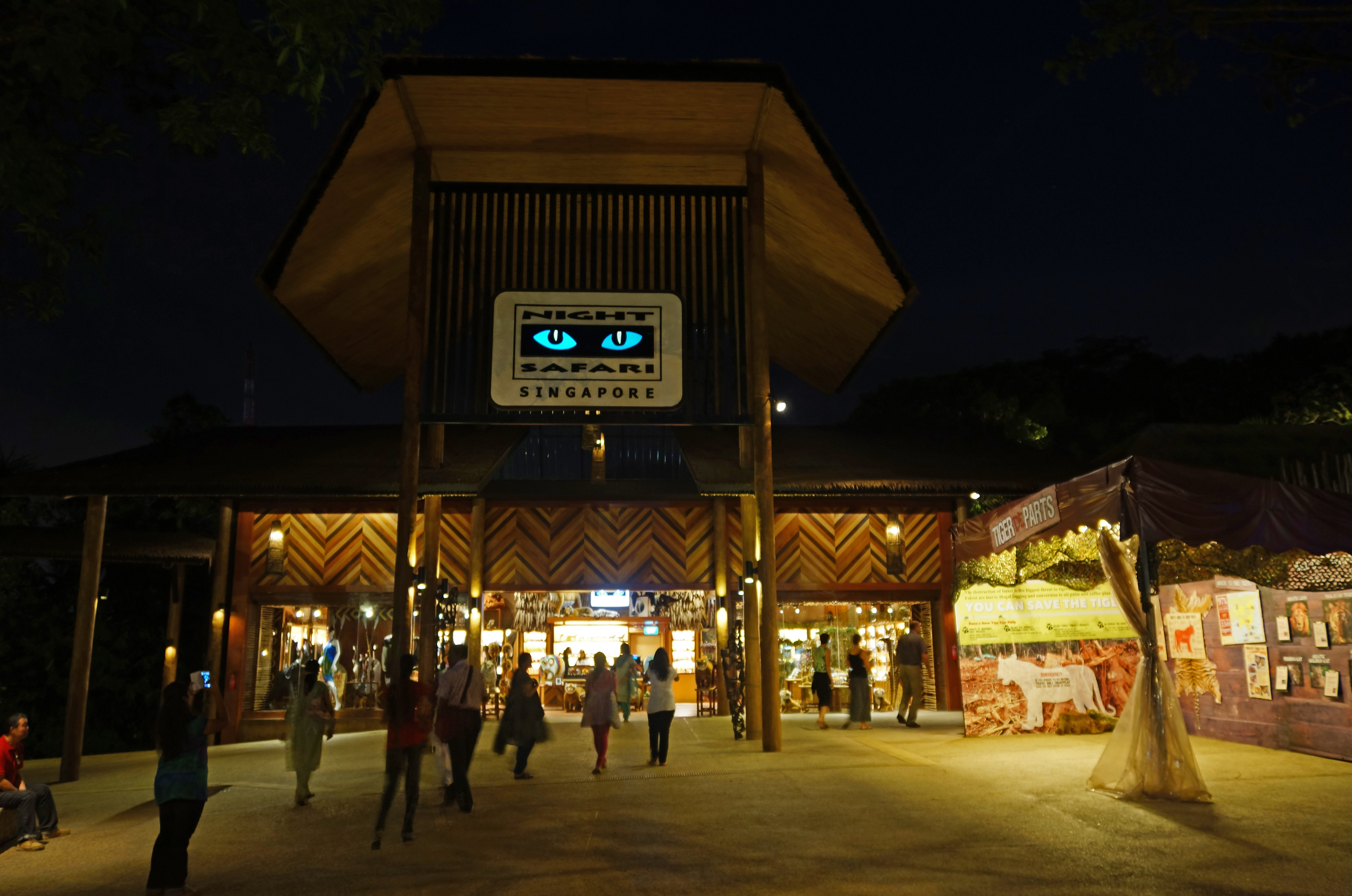
- Entrance of the Night Safari
- Interactive map of Night Safari
- 1.402260°N 103.787886°E
- Date opened: 26 May 1994; 32 years ago
- Location: Mandai, Singapore; 80 Mandai Lake Road, Singapore 729826
- Land area: 35 ha (86 acres)
- No. of animals: 900
- No. of species: 100
- Annual visitors: 1,321,718 (FY 2019/20)
- Major exhibits: 59
- Public transit: 138 (Note: via TE4 Springleaf and NS16 CR11 Ang Mo Kio); 927 (Note: via NS4 JS1 BP1 Choa Chu Kang)
- Website: Night Safari

Night Safari is the world's first nocturnal zoo, located in Mandai, Singapore. One of the country's most popular tourist attractions, it is one of five Mandai Wildlife Reserve parks, including Singapore Zoo, Bird Paradise, River Wonders, and Rainforest Wild ASIA.

The concept of a nocturnal park in Singapore was suggested in the 1980s by the former executive chairman of the Singapore Zoo, Ong Swee Law. Constructed at a cost of S$63 million, the Night Safari was officially opened on 26 May 1994 and occupies 35 hectares (86 acres) of secondary rainforest adjacent to the Singapore Zoo and Upper Seletar Reservoir.

The Night Safari currently houses over 900 animals representing over 100 species, of which 41% are threatened species. The Night Safari is managed by Mandai Wildlife Group, and about 1.3 million visitors visit the safari per year. The Night Safari received its 11 millionth visitor on 29 May 2007.

== History ==
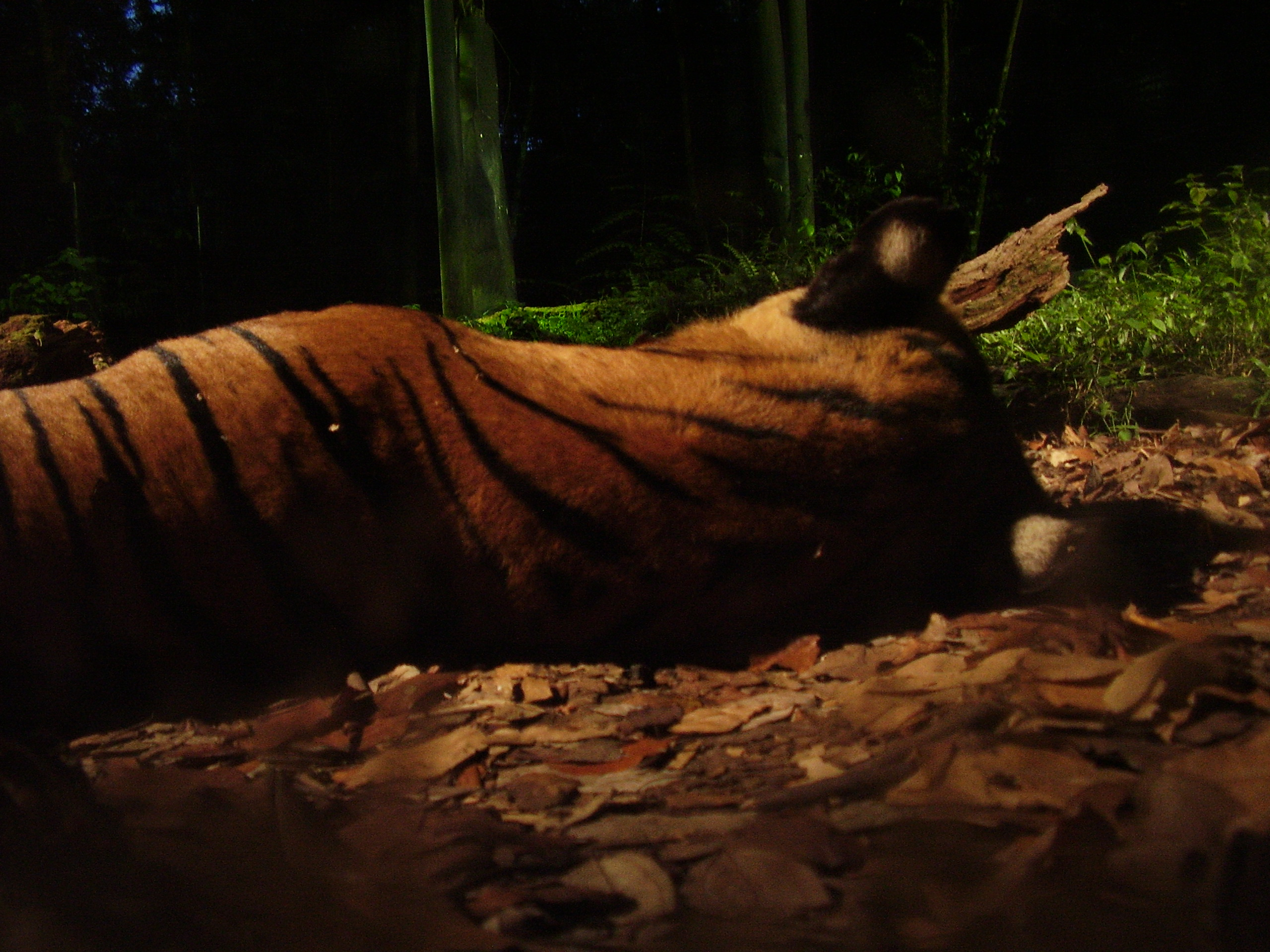
A tiger sleeping in the Night Safari.

Unlike traditional nocturnal houses, which reverse the day-night cycle of animals so they will be active by day, the Night Safari is an entire open-air zoo set in a humid tropical forest that is only open at night between 7pm and 12mn. It is divided into six geographical zones, which can be explored either on foot via four walking trails, or by tram.

The animals of the Night Safari, ranging from axis deer and African buffalo to Indian rhinoceros and pangolins to lions and Asian elephants, are made visible by lighting that resembles moonlight. Although it is brighter than full moonlight by a few orders of magnitude, it is dim enough not to disturb nocturnal and crepuscular animals' behaviour. London based lighting designer Simon Corder created the lighting for Night Safari.

The naturalistic enclosures simulate the animals' native habitat. Animals are separated from visitors with natural barriers, rather than caged, similar to the Singapore Zoo's open concept. Instead of vertical prison-like cages, cattle grids were laid all over the park to prevent hoofed animals from moving one habitat to another. These are grille-like metal sheets with gaps wide enough for animals' legs to go through. Moats were designed to look like streams and rivers to enable animals to be put on show in open areas, and hot wires were designed to look like twigs to keep animals away from the boundaries of their enclosures.

== Exhibits ==
=== Tram Trail ===
The tram takes visitors across the whole park, allowing visitors to view most of the park's larger animals.

- Bharal
- Markhor
- Greater flamingo
- Asiatic lion
- Barasingha
- Chital
- Indian rhinoceros
- Sloth bear
- Striped hyena
- African buffalo
- Eld's deer
- Hippopotamus
- Indian hog deer
- North Sulawesi babirusa
- Spotted hyena
- White Bengal Tiger
- Asian elephant
- Dhole
- Malayan tapir
- Sambar deer
- Gaur

=== Pangolin Trail ===
Formerly the Fishing Cat Trail, the Pangolin Trail features a variety of nocturnal animals, mostly from Asia and South America.

- Barasingha
- Barred eagle owl
- Binturong
- Black pond turtle
- Brazilian porcupine
- Buffy fish owl
- Common barn owl
- Common palm civet
- Eastern white pelican
- Fishing cat
- Gharial
- Giant anteater
- Gray-handed night monkey
- Indian muntjac
- Kinkajou
- Lesser mouse-deer
- Leopard cat
- Maned wolf
- Oriental small-clawed otter
- Small-toothed palm civet
- Southern river terrapin
- Southern three-banded armadillo
- Spectacled owl
- Spotted giant flying squirrel
- Striped hyena
- Sunda loris
- Sunda pangolin

=== Leopard Trail ===
The Leopard Trail houses a variety of nocturnal animals from the rainforests of Asia like clouded leopards, a flying fox walkthrough aviary, and habitats for some native animals. The Asiatic lions are also visible from a boardwalk on the edge of the trail.

- Asian palm civet
- Asian small-clawed otter
- Asiatic lion
- Binturong
- Buffy fish owl
- Clouded leopard
- Greater hog badger
- Indian crested porcupine
- Indian rhinoceros
- Large flying fox
- Leopard cat
- Lesser short-nosed fruit bat
- Malayan porcupine
- Masked palm civet
- Senegal bushbaby
- Small-toothed palm civet
- Spotted wood owl
- Spotted whistling duck
- Sunda pangolin
- Sunda slow loris

=== Tiger Trail ===
The trail leads to the crossroads of Africa and Asia.

- Aardvark
- Bongo
- Babirusa
- Red river hog
- Sloth bear
- Spotted hyena
- White Bengal tiger

=== Tasmanian Devil Trail ===
Opened in 2012, this trail features a wallaby walkthrough habitat and smaller enclosures for other nocturnal Australian animals. The trail also has a large man-made cave called the Naracoorte Cave, a reconstruction of the Naracoorte Caves National Park, which has several indigenous paintings and holds invertebrates and reptiles.

Four female Tasmanian devils arrived from the Trowunna Wildlife Sanctuary in November 2022, part of an insurance population managed by the Save the Tasmanian Devil Programme run by the Department of Natural Resources & Environment.

- Asian forest scorpion
- Cave racer
- Chilean rosehair tarantula
- Common brushtail possum
- Crested gecko
- North Island brown kiwi
- Madagascar hissing cockroach
- Mexican fireleg tarantula
- Morepork
- Red-necked wallaby
- Sugar glider
- Tasmanian devil
- Woylie

=== Creatures of the Night presentation ===
The Creatures of the Night presentation is a popular highlight at Night Safari, highlighting animal conservation and sustainability efforts.

- Asian small-clawed otter
- Binturong
- Bornean bearded pig
- Buffy fish owl
- Common raccoon dog
- Fennec fox
- Indian crested porcupine
- Raccoon
- Turkey vulture

=== Notable animals ===
- Chawang the Indian Elephant. Found in Malaysia in his youth, he is the animal icon of Night Safari and the largest resident in Singapore's wildlife parks.
- Tripod, an Indochinese Clouded Leopard who lost his front leg in a fight.
- Sipho, the park's male White African Lion.
- Thulie and Newari, a pair of Greater One Horned Rhino brothers..

In 2026, Mandai introduced the 'Stars of Mandai'. They are 25 individual animals, 5 representing each Mandai park, who represent their respective park. The five from Night Safari were the following:

- Neha the Indian Elephant: She is the daughter of Chawang and an elephant cow named Sri Nandong and born in 2016. According to Mandai, she is their 'iconic star'.
- Radin the Sunda Pangolin: He was born in 2014 to a female pangolin who was rescued by Mandai. He became a father in 2026.
- Newari the Indian Rhinoceros: He was born in 2016 and weighs 2.1 tonnes.
- Cogsworth the Tasmanian Devil: He is the boldest and most food motivated of the group.
- Narnia the Binturong: An animal ambassador who can be seen during the Creatures of the Night Presentation.

== Presentations ==
The "Creatures of the Night" presentation is a performance presented by the animals in the Night Safari. A binturong shows off its ability to hang upside down with its prehensile tail, a spotted hyena displays its powerful jaws and otters spread awareness to recycle reusable items.

Cultural performances are a regular feature at the safari, and include tribal dances, blowpipe demonstrations and fire eating displays.

== Gallery ==
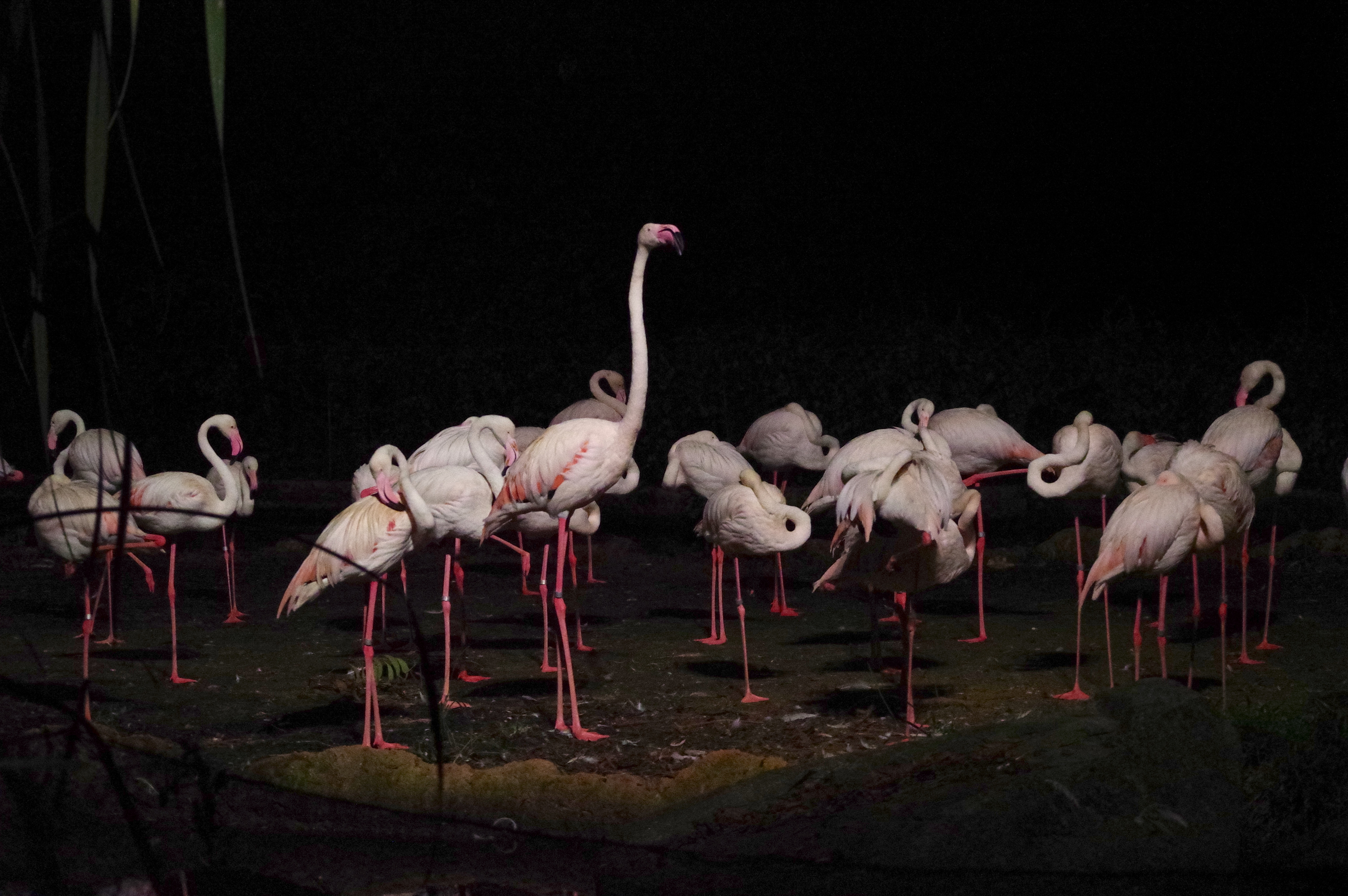
Greater flamingos

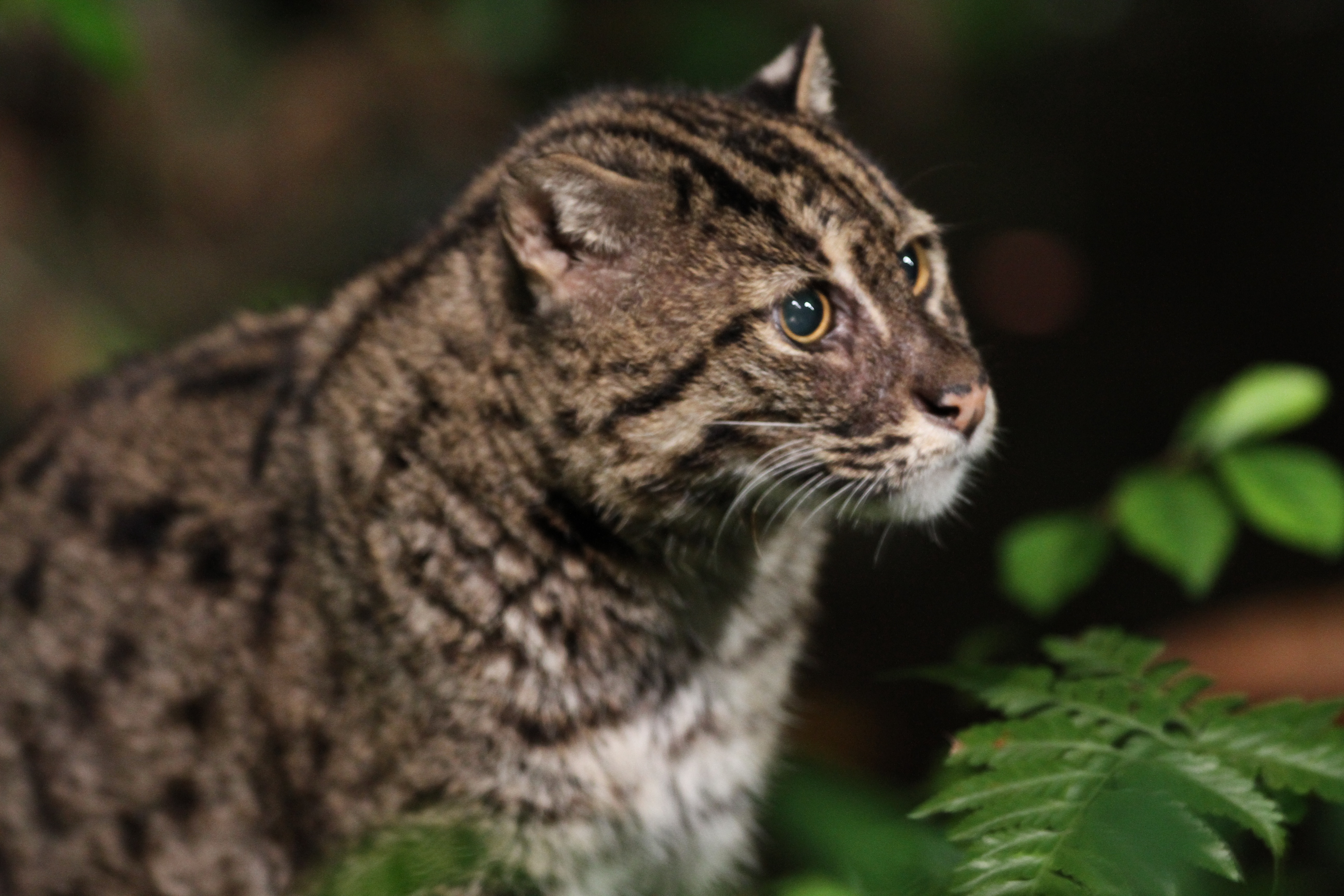
Fishing cat

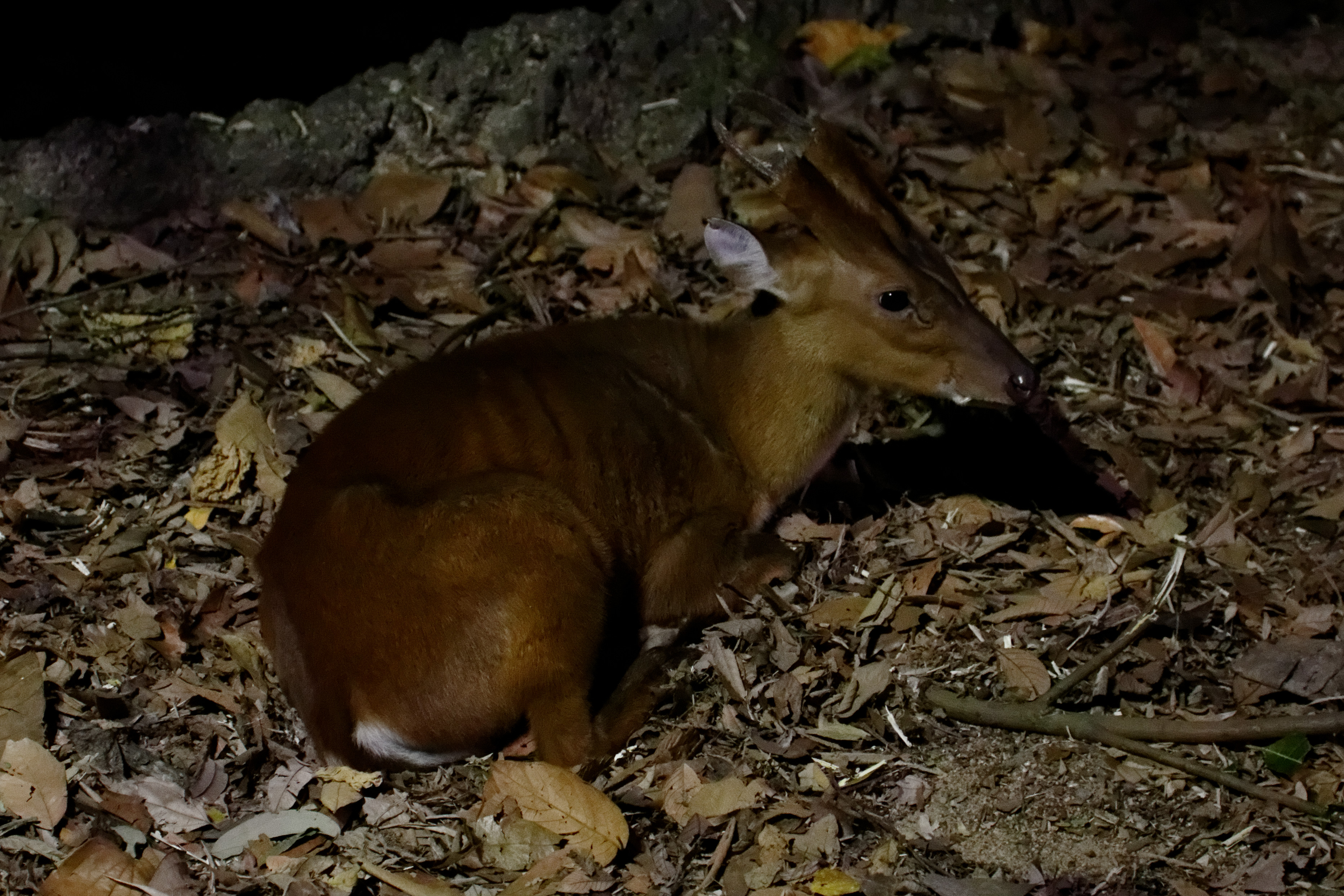
Southern red muntjac

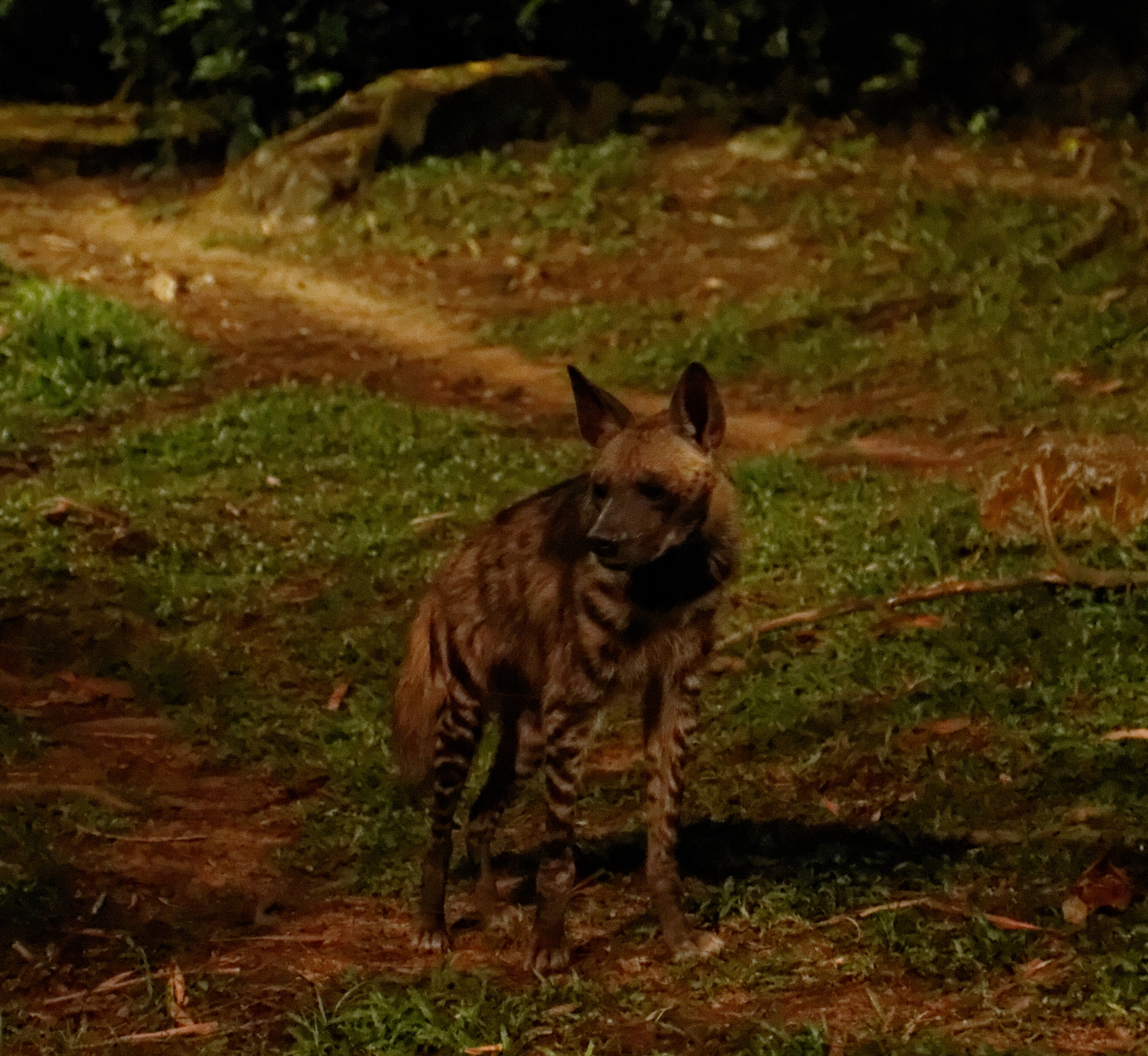
Striped hyena

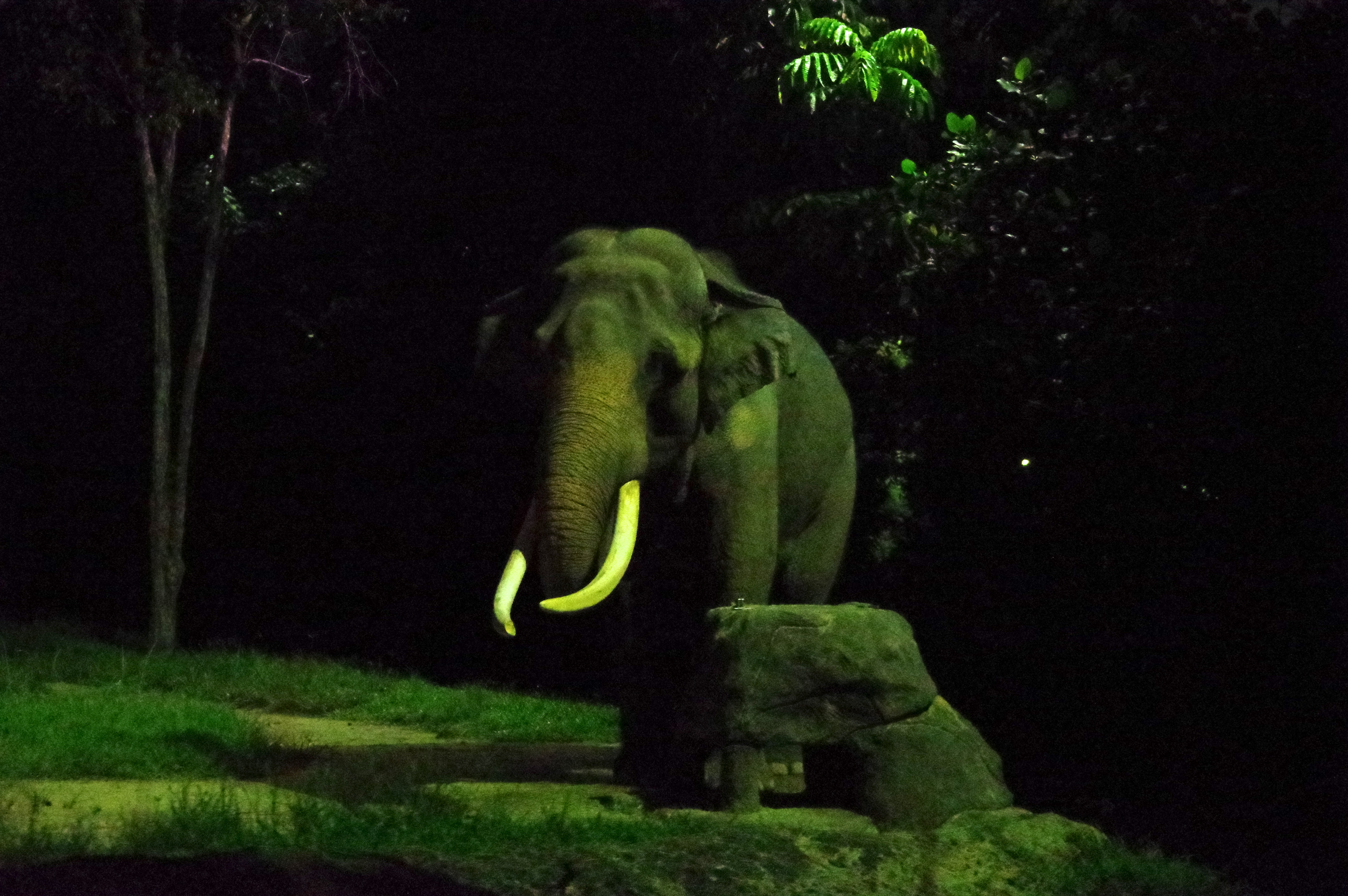
Bull Asian elephant, Chawang

== Awards ==
- ASEAN Tourism Association – Aseanta Awards For Excellence (1995)
  - Best New Attraction in ASEAN
- Singapore Tourism Awards
  - Top 10 Best Family Experience (2006)
  - Best Leisure Attraction Experience (2003, 2004, 2006)
  - Leisure Attraction of the Year (1996, 1997, 1999, 2000)
  - Best Trail Marshall of the Year, Mohammed Munzir Aziz. (2008)
  - Best Trail Marshall of the Year, Mohammad Ridhwan Shahril. (2009)
  - Best Ground crew of the Year, Vijayeswaran Visvalingam. (2009)
  - Best Animal Caretaker of the Year, Hadi Akmal (2015)

== Transportation ==
Night Safari is not served directly by any MRT line, with the nearest station being Springleaf MRT station. There are three bus services operated by SBS Transit, SMRT and Tower Transit which call at the zoo or pass by. Bus services 138 and 927 from Ang Mo Kio and Choa Chu Kang respectively call at a bus stop at the zoo. Bus service 171 plies the road along Mandai Road and not into the zoo.

=== Bus ===
A shuttle service, known as the Mandai Khatib Bus, plies daily between Khatib MRT station and the Zoo.
