= Coastal tourism in Singapore =

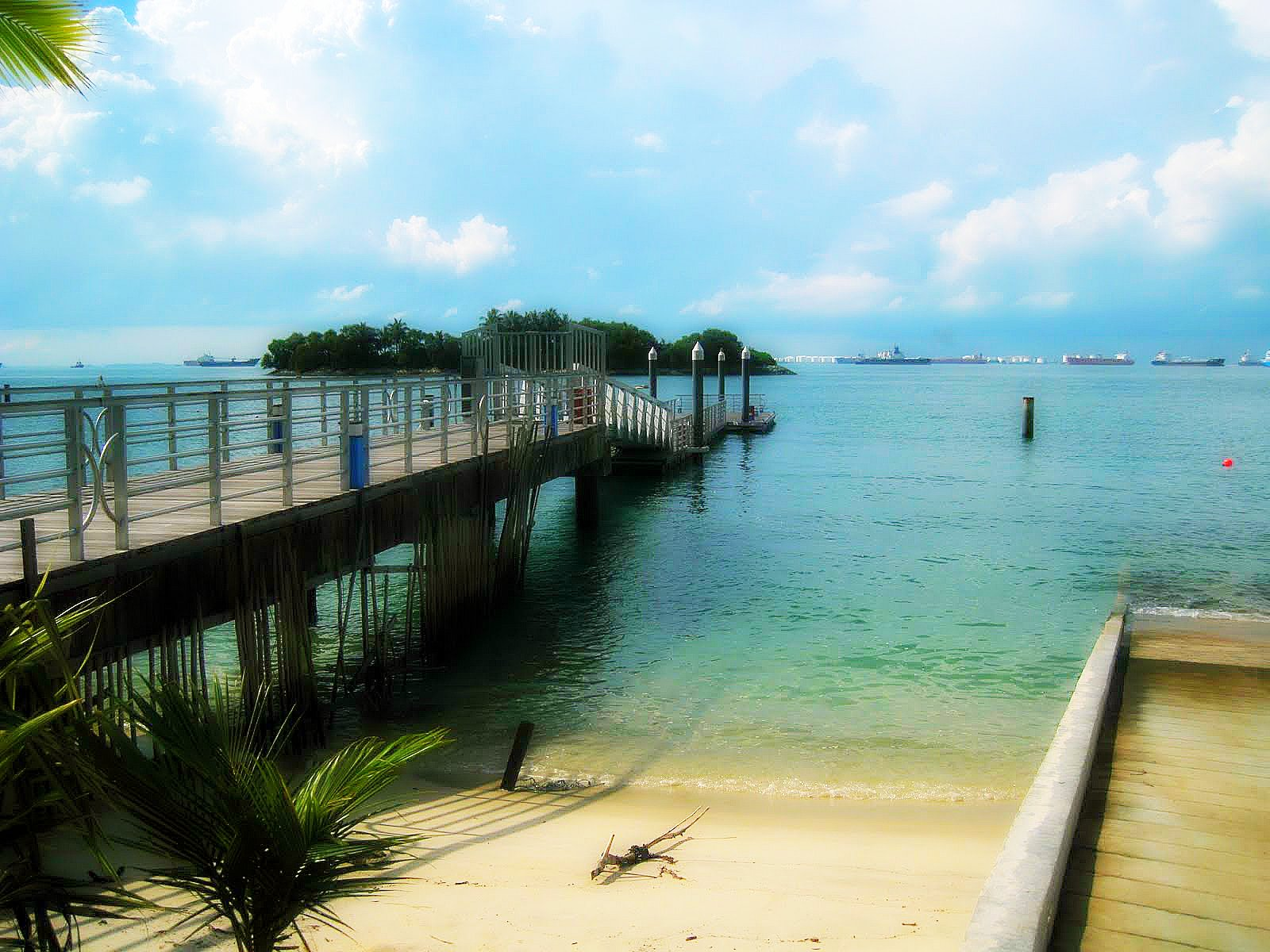
A platform on the coast of Siloso Beach, Sentosa Island, Singapore.

Coastal tourism in Singapore is tourism involving, or carried out on Singapore's nearshore waters and its beaches. This includes the coast of Singapore's mainland, as well as those of its offshore islands. Coastal tourism is currently a subset of the larger tourism industry in Singapore, and encompasses the idea of the "tourist coast," referring to the coast that has been "altered or modified for the purposes of recreation and tourism," according to Singaporean geomorphologist Wong Poh Poh. It caters to both foreign visitors to Singapore, as well as locals seeking recreational activities.

== Overview ==
Historically, the development of coastal tourism in Singapore can be traced back to the 1960s. This development occurred over the next few decades in a highly-contested competition for space and resources, due to the country's limited amount of land and even more limited amount of coast space. While coastal tourism has since been established as an economic industry, it remains small compared to other aspects of Singaporean tourism, with Sentosa Island being the biggest, as well as the only overt, prolonged example of coastal tourism in Singapore. Despite this, ideas of coastal tourism and of conceptualizing local beaches and shores as visitor hotspots remain relevant, as can be seen from Sentosa's consistent popularity, as well as a recent renewed interest in Singapore's offshore islands.

== History and development ==
=== 1960s: Coastal tourism subsumed under coastal recreation ===
Tourism was in its early stages of development in Singapore during the 1960s, with the official formation of the Singapore Tourism Promotion Board (STPB, later renamed Singapore Tourism Board) in 1964. During this period, coastal tourism in Singapore was minimal, and it was not considered a distinct category of tourism in Singapore. Most tourist facilities were located in the city center – farther 'inland' and away from the shoreline. Singapore's offshore islands, then inhabited by small indigenous communities, were also not accessible by foreign visitors.

Instead, it was coastal recreation that was more significant. Coastal recreation refers to all recreational and leisure activities carried out in coastal areas, but predominantly for the enjoyment of locals rather than tourists. The local government considered coastal recreational sites as a promising way to promote a sense of work-life balance among Singaporeans. Popular activities of coastal recreation among locals included seaside leisure at the Changi, Tanah Merah, Pasir Ris and Bedok beaches.

In 1963, the Housing Development Board (HDB) started the East Coast Reclamation Scheme, a land reclamation project on Singapore's eastern shoreline that would last until 1986 and reclaim 140 km of the shoreline. Included within this project was the plan for a beach and park – which would eventually become East Coast Park – alongside housing estates in Bedok and Katong.

The East Coast Reclamation Scheme set a precedent for other major land reclamation projects on other parts of the coast for recreational use. At the same time, Singapore was beginning to experience a squeeze in the scarce land space available for multiple competing needs, especially after losing access to the Malaysian hinterland following the 1965 separation. In 1969, the government passed the Foreshores Act, which placed Singapore's foreshores under state control. This also helped set the stage for the development of coastal tourism as a distinct industry, helmed by the government.

=== 1970s: Rise in tourism and coastal activities ===
At the turn of the decade, tourism in Singapore had begun to boom. This coincided with an increase in waterfront activities on Singapore's coastline. These activities included small tourist-oriented developments alongside various industrial, port and commercial uses to support the country's economic rise. This dual rise in tourism and coastal activities is attributed to the government's commitment to industrialization, as well as attracting foreign capital to the country.

However, Singapore noticeably lacked a strong coastal dimension in its appeal to foreign visitors. The STPB's main goal during this time was to present Singapore as an exotic, multicultural location where a Western tourist could experience all of Asia. Coastal tourism was neither a defined goal nor a priority.

Despite this, the government was beginning to pay more attention to Singapore's coastlines. During this time, the government had begun turning to Singapore's offshore islands as untapped resources to support the country's growth while offsetting the issue of land scarcity. Pulau Blakang Mati, later renamed Sentosa, was subsequently pitched as a tourist destination. Plans to develop Blakang Mati into a tourist hotspot had been conceived as early as 1967, but only took on a concrete realisation in 1972 with the formation of the Sentosa Development Corporation (SDC) as a government statutory board. The redevelopment plan of the SDC began with a mass eviction of the Blakang Mati locals to the mainland.

While the ensuing slew of tourist attractions on Sentosa successfully increased both local and foreign visitorship, the island's main draws at the time were its themed parks and historical attractions. A tourist-friendly coast was neither part of its attractions nor its appeal.

=== 1980s: Rise of coastal tourism and Sentosa ===
The 1980s saw the emergence of coastal tourism as a proper economic industry in Singapore, closely supervised by the government. The larger tourism industry continued to flourish, but the lack of coastal tourism had begun to place Singapore at an apparent disadvantage among its Southeast Asian neighbors. Coastal resort development had become a trend in the region. Bali, Langkawi and Penang, among others, were building resorts and other attractive, tourist-friendly amenities on their coasts and beaches, steadily creating an exotic resort island image that became an economic success. The government was cognizant of this trend, identifying the development of a "tropical island resort" as a theme to boost tourism in 1986.

Soon after, a massive beach reclamation project on the coast of Sentosa began in 1988. The natural beaches on the north side of the island, considered narrow, unsightly and unable to support infrastructure, were refurbished into robust, pristine ones with imported sand, coastal landscaping and the construction of lagoons and marinas. These beaches became the Tanjong, Siloso and Palawan beaches. Beach improvement, management and clean-up on Sentosa continued heavily throughout the 1980s and well into the 1990s, with the government investing S$8 million in Sentosa's coasts alone. These schemes were a success – the beaches became Sentosa's main attraction while the non-coastal attractions on the island began to waver in popularity and reception. The refurbished beaches would also provide the necessary foundations for more attractions to be built nearer to the coastline in the coming years, thus expanding Sentosa's tourist coasts.

The development of a tropical island resort was also extended to some of Singapore's offshore islands, such as Pulau Ubin and Lazarus Island. However, most of the funding and attention were channeled into Sentosa.

=== 1990s to present: Offshore islands and Bintan Resorts ===
At the turn of the century, coastal tourism remained a point of interest to the government. Following the successful transformation of Sentosa from tourist hotspot to a coastal fantasy, attention was now turned to the remaining offshore islands that offered similar potential for coastal tourism. In 1996, a Development Guide Plan for the Southern Islands was released by the Urban Redevelopment Authority (URA), outlining plans for beach, marina and coastal short-term accommodation on these islands alongside the tourist coast on Sentosa. The early 2000s saw the government investing S$50 million into a land reclamation and beach improvement project on St John's Island, Lazarus Island and Seringat Island. The goals of this investment was, once again, to provide a new, presentable beach suitable for recreation, and to increase foot traffic and visitorship to the islands.

The other key development for coastal tourism in Singapore was the development of resorts on the nearby Bintan Island in the early 1990s. This was a joint investment by the Singaporean and Indonesian governments. Bintan's pristine beaches and clear waters, paired with infrastructure to accommodate and entertain tourists, made it a resounding success as a tourist destination. The Singapore Tourism Board actively promoted Bintan as part of Singapore's coastal attractions, and the importance of Bintan to the coastal tourism industry in Singapore was only emphasised after the Board admitted that the local offshore islands could not compare to Bintan on the grounds of coastal amenities.

In the present day, coastal tourism development appears to have plateaued in Singapore. This is likely due to the lack of remaining coast space to allow for any new major developments or innovation. Additionally, the "coast" aspect of Singapore's key coastal tourism endeavors seems to be of less priority to the state. For the offshore islands, the government's focus has pivoted from potential coastal tourism to a more rural, "rustic" site of heritage and history. As for Sentosa, the opening of Resorts World Sentosa in 2010 has shifted Sentosa's appeal from a sunny, coastal island to the uniquely Singaporean model of the "integrated resort," boasting a mix of "entertainments, amenities and accommodation," rather than the coast.

Still, the Singaporean government maintains an interest in its coastlines: Sentosa, the magnum opus of Singapore's coastal tourism, continues to be monitored and re-developed, with new coastal amenities and attractions, such as Skypark Sentosa on Siloso Beach. Sentosa's beaches also remain popular and well-received by locals and tourists alike. There has also been renewed local interest in the offshore islands despite fluctuating visitor numbers.
