= List of licensed and localized editions of Monopoly: Africa and Asia =

The following is a list of game boards of the Parker Brothers/Hasbro board game Monopoly adhering to a particular theme or particular locale in Africa, Asia and the Middle East. Lists for other regions can be found here. The game is licensed in 114 countries and printed in 47 languages.

== Africa ==
=== Egypt ===
Cairo

=== Nigeria ===
Lagos

=== Rhodesia ===
Rhodesia edition (now Zimbabwe) – Tycoon, produced in limited numbers by Darten in the late 1960s, depicted colonial-era streets in Salisbury (now Harare).

Tycoon

Copyright date: c. 1967	Released by: Darten

Car Park	Mazoe Road	Pot Luck	Golden Stairs Road	Lomagundi Road	Gwelo station	Cecil Square	King George Road	Water Reservoir	Kingsway	Go To Prison
Rhodes Avenue	Tycoon									Enterprise Road
North Avenue	Tycoon									Arcturus Road
Post Box	Tycoon									Post Box
Moffat Street	Tycoon									Borrowdale Road
Salisbury station	Tycoon									Bulawayo station
Coronation Avenue	Tycoon									Pot Luck
Jameson Avenue	Tycoon									Stanley Avenue
Electricity Supply	Tycoon									P.A.Y.E.
Salisbury Drive	Tycoon									First Street
Prison	Charter Road	Railway Avenue	Pot Luck	Widdicombe Road	Umtali station	P.A.Y.E	Victoria Street	Post Box	Rotten Row	Start

=== Tour Mama Africa International ===
Tour Mama Africa Franschhoek Monopoly edition

Copyright date: 2023	Released by: Tour Mama Africa

Free Regional Parking	Adderley Street	Location	Victoria &Alfred Waterfront	Strand Street	Cape Town station	Parliament Street	Plein Street	Groot Constantia Road	Long Street	Go To Jail Robben Island
Daniel Hugo Street	Tour Mama Africa Franschhoek Monopoly edition									Oxford Road
Franschhoek Pass	Tour Mama Africa Franschhoek Monopoly edition									Rivonia Street
Distance	Tour Mama Africa Franschhoek Monopoly edition									Location
Huguenot Street	Tour Mama Africa Franschhoek Monopoly edition									Devilliers Street
La Provence station	Tour Mama Africa Franschhoek Monopoly edition									Gautrain station
Dassenberg Road	Tour Mama Africa Franschhoek Monopoly edition									Chance
Cabriere Street	Tour Mama Africa Franschhoek Monopoly edition									Jan Smuts Avenue
Map Point	Tour Mama Africa Franschhoek Monopoly edition									Super Tax
Oak street	Tour Mama Africa Franschhoek Monopoly edition									Eloff Street
Jail Victor Verster Nelson Mandela	Marine Parade	Smith Street	Chance	Florida Road	Durban station	Income Tax	Musgrave Road	Distance	Browns Road	Tour Mama Africa Go

South African (Afrikaans)

Copyright date: 2023	Released by: Tour Mama Africa

Gratis Parkeering	Groote Schuurstraat	Kans	Strandstraat	Roelandstraat	Kaapstad Stasie	Parlementstraat	Pleinstraat	Waterraad	Longstraat	Tronk Toe
Voortrekkerweg	South African (Afrikaans)									Mainstraat
Hoffmanplein	South African (Afrikaans)									Joubertstraat
Gemeenskapskas	South African (Afrikaans)									Gemeenskapskas
President Brandstraat	South African (Afrikaans)									Devilliersstraat
Bloemfontein Stasie	South African (Afrikaans)									Johannesburg Stasie
MaitlandStraat	South African (Afrikaans)									Kans
Aliwalstraat	South African (Afrikaans)									Jan Smutslaan
Elektrisiteit	South African (Afrikaans)									Super Belasting
Monumentweg	South African (Afrikaans)									Eloffstraat
Tronk	Marine Parade	Smithstraat	Kans	Weststraat	Durban Stasie	Inkomstebelasting	Gillespiestraat	Gemeenskapskas	Musgraveweg	Tour Mama Africa Go

- 1963 version (from cheap to expensive: Durban, Bloemfontein, Cape Town, Johannesburg)
  - Durban – Musgrave|Gillespie (brown), Durban station, Smith|West|Marine Parade (blue)
  - Bloemfontein – Monument|Aliwal|Maitland (purple), Bloemfontein station, President Brand|Hofmeyer|Voortrekker (orange)
  - Cape Town – Groote Schuur|Strand|Roeland (red), Cape Town station, Plein|Parliament|Long (yellow)
  - Johannesburg – Main|Joubert|De Villiers (green), Johannesburg station, Jan Smuts|Eloff (dark purple)
- 2002 version (from cheap to expensive: KwaZulu-Natal, South-Eastern Cape region, Garden Route region, Johannesburg, Western Cape region).

== Asia ==
Entries for Russia and Turkey can be found on the Europe page.

=== China & Hong Kong ===
China: 4 editions including a Here and Now: China edition, a China edition, a special Beijing edition released during the 2008 Olympics as well as a Hong Kong Monopoly edition.

In Chinese-speaking regions (including Hong Kong), the first name in Chinese was 財源廣進 (lit. financial resources) (in 1965), and the second (in 1973) was 大富翁 (lit. rich person), but both of these were unauthorized clones of the original. Hasbro eventually designated an official Chinese title: 地產大亨 (lit. Real Estate Tycoon). Many Monopoly game sets were relabeled as a result. However, the Hong Kong version remains officially branded as 大富翁.

Despite this, many Monopoly clones still use the old Chinese name. When Chinese developers started making computerized versions of Monopoly clones, they diverged from the original in board layout and game rules, but the key elements of dice rolls and land acquisitions remain.

In the mid-1990s, Monopoly was sold in Mainland China under a different name (强手棋), which does not have localized place names.

=== India ===
India edition – called Business (English version) and Vyapar (Hindi version), using major Indian cities, airports and railway stations and Indian rupee for currency.

India

Free Parking	Lucknow	Chance	Chandigargh	Jaipur	Delhi Station	Pune	Hyderabad	Water Works	Ahmedabad	Go To Jail
Kochi	India									Kolkata
Nagpur	India									Chennai
Community Chest	India									Community Chest
Indore	India									Bengaluru
Howrah Junction railway station	India									Chhatrapati Shivaji Terminus
Bhopal	India									Chance
Patna	India									Delhi
Electric Company	India									Super Tax
Ludhiana	India									Mumbai
Jail	Vadodara	Agra	Chance	Panaji(GOA)	Chennai Central Railway Station	Income Tax	Bhubaneshwar	Community Chest	Guwahati	Go

Funskool (India) Ltd. has published Monopoly in India since 1987.

India edition

Copyright date: 2008	Released by: Funskool (India) Ltd.

Free Parking	Lucknow; 220	Chance ?	Chandigarh; 220	Jaipur; 240	New Delhi Railway Station; 200	Pune; 260	Hyderabad; 260	Water Works; 150	Ahmedabad; 280	Go To Jail
Kochi; 200	India edition									Kolkata; 300
Nagpur; 180	India edition									Chennai; 300
Community Chest	India edition									Community Chest
Indore; 180	India edition									Bengaluru; 320
Howrah Railway Station £200	India edition									Chhatrapati Shivaji Terminus (Victoria terminus); 200
Bhopal; 160	India edition									Chance ?
Patna; 140	India edition									Delhi; 350
Electric Company; 150	India edition									Super Tax (pay 100)
Ludhiana; 140	India edition									Mumbai; 400
In Jail/Just Visiting	Vadodara; 120	Agra; 100	Chance ?	Panaji (Goa); 100	Chennai Central Railway Station; 200	Income Tax (pay 200)	Bhubaneshwar; 60	Community Chest	Guwahati; 60	Collect 200 salary as you pass GO

Game description: The spaces are named after cities in India. The railway stations are from Chennai, New Delhi, Howrah and Mumbai.
Tokens: 8 gold plastic tokens (shoe, auto-rickshaw, peacock, tiger, elephant, houseboat, diya and ?)
Other features: 2 small white dice and 1 large red speed die. The back of the board is black and folds in 4. The 7 banknotes are printed in black on colored paper in the denominations: 1 (black on white) – 5 – 10 – 20 – 50 – 100 and 500.

=== Indonesia ===
Indonesian

Parkir Bebas	Prambanan	Kesempatan	Kraton Yogya	Bengawan Solo	Stasiun Pasar Turi	Sarangan	Selecta	Perusahaan Air	Gunung Kawi	Pergi ke Penjara
Borobudur	Indonesian									Pantai Sanur
Kopeng	Indonesian									Tampak Siring
Dana Umum	Indonesian									Dana Umum
Gedung Batu	Indonesian									Taman Laut Banda
Terminal Bis Semarang	Indonesian									Pelabuhan Belawan
Tangkuban Perahu	Indonesian									Kesempatan
Pelabuhan Ratu	Indonesian									Danau Toba
Perusahaan Listrik	Indonesian									Pajak Istimewa
Kebun Raya Bogor	Indonesian									Brastagi
Penjara	Taman Pluit	Binaria	Kesempatan	Ragunan Pasar Minggu	Bandara Kemayoran	Pajak Jalan	Taman Mini	Dana Umum	Monas	Mulai – Rp 200

Game description: Known as 'Monopoli', the properties are towns, attractions and geographic features in Indonesia.

=== Japan ===
Japan edition – Both Japanese and American English boards are sold in Japan. The Japanese board includes districts from several major Japanese cities: the most expensive property is Tokyo's Ginza, followed by Osaka's Umeda, while the cheapest properties are Chiba and Sapporo.

Ultraman edition

Copyright date: 2004	Released by: Parker Brothers/Hasbro	Issued through: General release

Game description: A Japanese board using Ultraman characters. Placenames are replaced by monsters' home planets and Earth Defence forces headquarters.
Tokens: Different versions of Ultraman.
Other features: Currency in this game is Star (e.g.: *5 in place of $5 in original board game).
Image: see BoardGameGeek entry

=== Malaysia ===
Malaysia (Kuala Lumpur)

Free Parking	Jalan Tun Razak	Cuba Nasib	Jalan Riong	Dataran Merdeka	Johor Bahru Station	Penang Road	Jalan Sultan Iskandar	Jabatan Bekalan Air	Central Market	Go To Jail
Campbell Street	Malaysia (Kuala Lumpur)									Subang Jaya
Jalan Tebrau	Malaysia (Kuala Lumpur)									Bangsar
Kebajikan Masyarakat	Malaysia (Kuala Lumpur)									Kebajikan Masyarakat
Jalan Duta	Malaysia (Kuala Lumpur)									Ampang
Ipoh Station	Malaysia (Kuala Lumpur)									Kuala Lumpur Station
Jalan Tuanku Abdul Rahman	Malaysia (Kuala Lumpur)									Cuba Nasib
Jalan Masjid India	Malaysia (Kuala Lumpur)									Jalan Bukit Bintang
Tenaga Nasional	Malaysia (Kuala Lumpur)									VIP Tax
Jalan Wong Ah Fook	Malaysia (Kuala Lumpur)									Jalan Sultan Ismail
Jail	Imbi Road	Petaling Street	Cuba Nasib	Jalan Hang Jebat	Butterworth Station	Income Tax	Jalan Chow Kit	Kebajikan Masyarakat	Gurney Drive	Go

Putrajaya edition

In Malaysia, there is also an independent version marketed, known as Saidina. Saidina is a Malaysian rendition of the game featuring local places and currency, and written in Bahasa Melayu.

=== Pakistan ===
Pakistan edition – Known as Crorepati baopaar.

=== Philippines ===
Philippines (Metro Manila)

Copyright date: 2009	Released by: Hasbro

Free Parking	Gilmore Avenue	Chance ?	Aurora Boulevard	EDSA (Cubao)	Light Rail Transit 3	Shaw Boulevard	Meralco Avenue	Water Works	Ortigas Avenue	Go To Jail
E. Rodriguez Avenue	Philippines (Metro Manila)									P. Burgos Street
Timog Avenue	Philippines (Metro Manila)									Jupiter Street
Community Chest	Philippines (Metro Manila)									Community Chest
Tomas Morato Avenue	Philippines (Metro Manila)									Sen. Gil J. Puyat Avenue
Light Rail Transit 2	Philippines (Metro Manila)									Light Rail Transit 4
Quezon Avenue	Philippines (Metro Manila)									Chance ?
Pedro Gil	Philippines (Metro Manila)									Makati Avenue
Electric Company	Philippines (Metro Manila)									Property Tax
Quirino Highway	Philippines (Metro Manila)									Ayala Avenue
Jail	Roxas Boulevard	Rizal Avenue	Chance ?	Ongpin Street	Light Rail Transit 1	Income Tax	Claro M. Recto Street	Community Chest	Abad Santos	Go

2005 edition – the first Filipino localization of the board game; includes properties from Laoag, Metro Manila, Cebu, and Davao. Currency was denominated in Philippine pesos, multiplied by 100 from the standard dollar/pound value, with airports substituting for the railway lines.

2009 edition – Post-2008 rules and game board (including the Speed Die), properties include streets from around Metro Manila, with Ayala Avenue being the most expensive property. Railway spaces are Light Rail Transits, numbered from 1 to 4, and the Luxury Tax space is called "Property Tax." Currency is denominated in Monopoly Dollars.

2012 Here & Now edition – Although labeled simply as Monopoly Philippines, the board features landmarks from all over the Philippines, including the Mayon Volcano, Banaue Rice Terraces, Boracay, and Pagudpud (the most expensive property)

2025 Beaches of the Philippines edition - A special localized version of Monopoly featuring well-known beaches in the Philippines was created by Gaming Library along with Hasbro, the Department of Tourism (Philippines), and Winning Moves Games. The game was officially launched during Gaming Library's High Stakes event from October 3-5, 2025.

=== Republic of Korea (South Korea) ===
The version of Monopoly currently distributed in the Republic of Korea (South Korea) was copyrighted in 2009 by Hasbro.

The game is in Korean only; the only word on the game in English is "GO". On the board below, the Korean text (including what is in brackets) actually appears on the game. The English translation and transliteration (appearing after the comma) is provided for convenience only and does not appear on the actual game board.

The currency used in the game is shown with the letter "M" crossed by two horizontal lines. This is not the real currency of the Republic of Korea.

Republic of Korea (South Korea)
(2009)

Copyright date: 2009	Released by: Hasbro

무료 주차장, Free Parking	제주 (특별자치도), Jeju (Special Self-Governing Province)	찬스, Chance	여수 (전라남도), Yeosu (Jeollanam-do)	광주 (광역시), Gwangju (Metropolitan City)	경춘선, Gyeongchun Line	춘천 (강원도), Chuncheon (Gangwon-do)	강릉 (강원도), Gangneung (Gangwon-do)	수자원공사; Water Works	원주 (강원도), Wonju (Gangwon-do)	감옥으로 가세요, Please Go To Jail
부산 (광역시), Busan (Metropolitan City)	Republic of Korea (South Korea) (2009)									청주 (충청북도), Cheongju (Chungcheonbuk-do)
울산 (광역시), Ulsan (Metropolitan City)	Republic of Korea (South Korea) (2009)									천안 (충청북도), Cheonan (Chungcheonbuk-do)
공동 기금, Community Chest	Republic of Korea (South Korea) (2009)									공동 기금, Community Chest
창원 (경상남도), Changwon (Gyeongsangnam-do)	Republic of Korea (South Korea) (2009)									대전 (광역시), Daejeon (Metropolitan City)
경부선, Gyeongbu Line	Republic of Korea (South Korea) (2009)									중앙선, Central Line
대구 (광역시), Daegu (Metropolitan City)	Republic of Korea (South Korea) (2009)									찬스, Chance
포항 (경상북도), Pohang (Gyeonsangbuk-do)	Republic of Korea (South Korea) (2009)									인천 (광역시), Incheon (Metropolitan City)
전력공사, Electric Company	Republic of Korea (South Korea) (2009)									특별 소비세, Special Tax
경주 (경상북도), Gyeongju (Gyeonsangbuk-do)	Republic of Korea (South Korea) (2009)									서울 (특별시), Seoul (Special City)
감옥, Jail ---------- 잠시 면회 중, Briefly Visiting	전주 (전라북도), Jeonju (Jeollabuk-do)	익산 (전라북도), Iksan (Jeollabuk-do)	찬스, Chance	군산 (전라북도), Gunsan (Jeollabuk-do)	호남선, Honam Line	소득세, Income Tax	용인 (경기도), Yongin (Gyeonggi-do)	공동 기금, Community Chest	수원 (경기도), Suwon (Gyeonggi-do)	월급날 (GO), Monthly Payday (GO)

A previous version of Monopoly distributed in the Republic of Korea (South Korea) was released in June 2008 and copyrighted in 2008 by Hasbro.

The game is in Korean only; the only words on the game in English are "GO" and "MONOPOLY". On the board below, the Korean text actually appears on the game. The English translation and transliteration (provided in brackets) is provided for convenience only and does not appear on the actual game board.

The currency used in the game is shown with the letter "M" crossed by two horizontal lines. This is not the real currency of the Republic of Korea.

Republic of Korea (South Korea)
(June 2008)

Copyright date: 2008	Released by: Hasbro

무료 주차장 (Free Parking)	울산 (Ulsan)	찬스 (Chance)	대구 (Daegu)	부산 (Busan)	부산역 (Busan Station)	부천 (Bucheon)	인천 (Incheon)	수도공사 (Water Works)	수원 (Suwon)	감옥으로 가세요 (Please Go To Jail)
대전 (Daejeon)	Republic of Korea (South Korea) (June 2008)									신촌 (Sinchon)
천안 (Cheonan)	Republic of Korea (South Korea) (June 2008)									여의도 (Yeoido)
공동 기금 (Community Chest)	Republic of Korea (South Korea) (June 2008)									공동 기금 (Community Chest)
청주 (Cheongju)	Republic of Korea (South Korea) (June 2008)									잠실 (Jamsil)
광주역 (Gwangju Station)	Republic of Korea (South Korea) (June 2008)									서울역 (Seoul Station)
광주 (Gwangju)	Republic of Korea (South Korea) (June 2008)									찬스 (Chance)
전주 (Jeonju)	Republic of Korea (South Korea) (June 2008)									명동 (Myeongdong)
전력공사 (Electric Company)	Republic of Korea (South Korea) (June 2008)									세금 (Tax)
목포 (Mokpo)	Republic of Korea (South Korea) (June 2008)									강남 (Gangnam)
감옥 (Jail) ---------- 잠시 방문중 (Briefly Visiting)	춘천 (Chuncheon)	강릉 (Gangneung)	찬스 (Chance)	원주 (Wonju)	춘천역 (Chuncheon station)	소득세 (Income Tax)	제주 (Jeju)	공동 기금 (Community Chest)	서귀포 (Seogwipo)	금여 M200 받기 GO 출발점 (Collect M200 as you pass GO)

=== Singapore ===
Singapore

Free Parking	Robinson Road	Chance	Shenton Way	Collyer Way	Jurong East Station	Marina Square	Emerald Hill	Water Works	Raffles City	Go To Changi Prison
St. Andrews Road	Singapore									Tanglin Road
Havelock Road	Singapore									Orchard Road
Community Chest	Singapore									Community Chest
Colombo Court	Singapore									Scotts Road
City Hall Station	Singapore									Bedok Station
Connaught Drive	Singapore									Chance
Empress Place	Singapore									Nassim Road
Electric Company	Singapore									Super Tax
Battery Road	Singapore									Queen Astrid Park
Changi Prison	Thomson Road	Braddell Road	Chance	Farrer Road	Ang Mo Kio Station	Income Tax	Serangoon Road	Community Chest	Geylang	Go

Three versions were produced, the first in 1987 featuring local street names, a newer Uniquely Singapore edition introduced in 2005 with tourism sites in collaboration with the Singapore Tourism Board, and a PropNex edition in 2021.

=== Taiwan ===
There's at least two variants of Monopoly board game based on Taiwan, the first being made available in 2002.

=== Thailand ===
There is one edition dedicated to the whole country, this edition is bi-lingual (Thai & English), and there are three other sets, dedicated to the cities: Bangkok, Chiang Mai and Phuket.

== Middle East ==
=== Iran ===
Tehran edition – called Iropoly using Iranian rial for currency. In various versions, with the major difference being the use of pre- or post-Iranian Revolution street names.

=== Iraq ===
Baghdad game (لعبة بغداد)

Iraq edition (1986)

Copyright date: 1986	Released by: Doudabdulrahim Works

Intidar Mazani	Aalaija	Had (Chance)	Shareaa Zeria (Zeria street)		Babylon		Shareaa Goulafeh (Goulafeh street)	El Zjaniya	Sahat Teherir (Teherirs place)
Shareaa Cefa (Cefa street)	Iraq edition (1986)									Shareaa Aladoun (Aladoun street)
Ouaziria (Ministry)	Iraq edition (1986)									Shareaa Al Rasheed (Al Rasheed street)
Sandok Aleuba (C.Chest)	Iraq edition (1986)									Sandok Aleuba (C.Chest)
Shareaa Philisten (Palestine street)	Iraq edition (1986)									Shareaa Abinazes (Abinazes street)
Al-Mansour Mella	Iraq edition (1986)									Al Rasheed
Medina Marmouk (Marmouk Town)	Iraq edition (1986)									Had (Chance)
Zebounah (Customer)	Iraq edition (1986)									Mansour
Djazira Bagdad Sijaha (Bagdad Tourist Island)	Iraq edition (1986)									Dharebet Daghel (Income Tax)
Bagdad Zsedida (New Bagdad)	Iraq edition (1986)									Alzahria
	Shareaa Senaha (Industry street)	Beyaha (Salesman)	Had (Chance)	Kanoun Raribetou (Gerechtshof)	Ishtar Sheraton	Dharebet Emlek (Property Tax)	Hai Shar (Public street)	Sandok Aleuba (C.Chest)	Hai Khahera (Khahera street)	Start (200 Dinar)

=== Israel ===
Israel edition – Known as 'מונופול' – Monopol.

=== Lebanon ===
Lebanon edition. Based on Beirut streets, and Lebanese currencies.

=== Saudi Arabia ===
Riyadh edition
