= Passion Made Possible =

Destination brand of Singapore

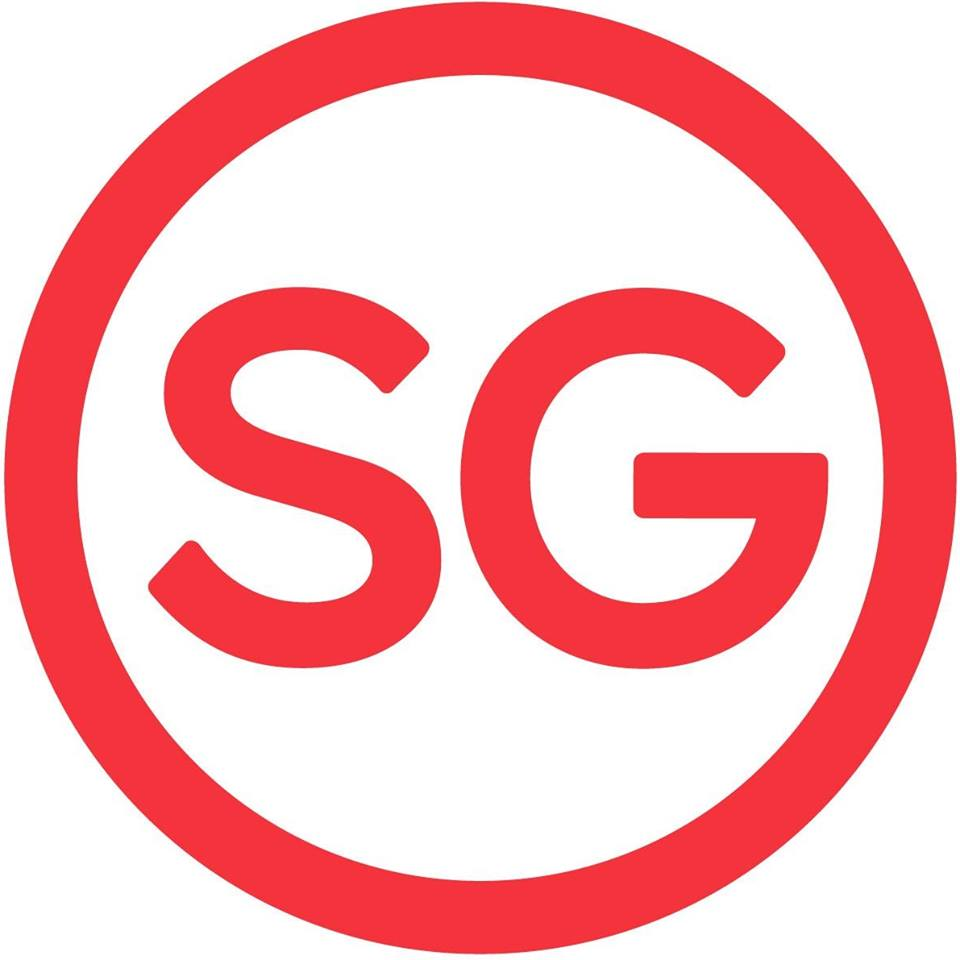
The unified brand features a logo coined as the 'Singapore Mark'.

Passion Made Possible is the destination brand of Singapore, jointly launched on 24 August 2017 by Singapore Tourism Board (STB) and Economic Development Board (EDB). Passion Made Possible marks the rebranding of the Singaporean brand, replacing the previous YourSingapore campaign.

The brand strategy will be adopted by other statutory boards and agencies under the Ministry of Trade and Industry (MTI) and incorporated into their marketing campaigns and tradeshows when reaching out to international audiences.

== Evolution of previous tourism campaigns ==
Since the launch of the Uniquely Singapore destination brand in 2004, Singapore witnessed a 16.8% growth in visitor arrivals and a 55.1% growth in its tourism receipts. In order to keep tourism in Singapore competitive and relevant to its visitors, STB hopes to establish its digital presence given the high internet penetration in its key markets, hence embarking on the 2010 YourSingapore campaign to drive users to its online website and social media accounts.

YourSingapore was positioned as Singapore's ability to promise travelers a personal travel experience, given the degree of efficiency, control and comfort in the country. Such a promise further offers an emotional reward of empowerment and liberation to its visitors.

With a different approach from previous STB brand slogan YourSingapore and EDB's Future Ready Singapore, Passion Made Possible was derived in 2017 in the hope of showcasing the country's entrepreneurial and innovative strengths to the world, under a joint branding campaign between its tourism and business government agencies to market the country to tourists, consumers, investors and businesses.

== Digital media ==
The Passion Made Possible rebranding campaign continues to employ a drive-to-web strategy, driving visitors to VisitSingapore.com where they can explore Singapore online, plan their itineraries and share their travel experiences.

The VisitSingapore website is managed by STB's creative agency, TBWA Singapore. It has two different sites to cater to different audiences; the leisure travel site and the business travel site.

In line with the brand strategy, STB continues to engage users on social media.

== The logo ==
The unified brand features a logo coined as the 'Singapore Mark'. It an emblem that is meant to represent Singapore's attributes as a place that is trusted to deliver, resembling a trust stamp that connotes quality.

The new logo was developed by TSLA Design, the branding and design practice of The Secret Little Agency (TSLA). TSLA was tasked with developing the new unified business and tourism brand identity, as well as the global branding guidelines for Singapore.

== Reactions ==
Reactions to the brand slogan were mixed, with some online internet users and academics describing the slogan as vague and not entirely representative of Singapore, while some suggest it is "generic enough to use in different contexts". Others contend that the slogan was identical to the title of a self-help book by Celeste Tomasulo, and was not worth the millions spent on branding and market research.

The shared branding between the EDB and the STB was deemed "ambitious" but could have a "synergistic effect" if the campaign is well-executed.

== See also ==
- Singapore Tourism Board
- Tourism in Singapore
- YourSingapore
- Singapore
