= Conference management =

Conference management relates to the executive management of a conference which may be in-house within an organization, or for a client of a professional conference organizer (PCO). It consists of the basic management tools that involve planning, organizing, leading and controlling, which are clerical tasks, but also skills related to "applied social psychology."

Arranging a conference from conceptualization to execution can take from 17 days (professionals in the field of conference production) to almost 12 or 18 months. While in the 20th century, the norm was for volunteer-organized conferences, in the 21st century, conference management is a full-time, professional role, either an entrepreneurial member of the organization, or the executive director.

Conferences range from small-scale executive meetings to international summit conferences, and may cater for up to 65,000 people at a time in a venue of appropriate size (e.g. a stadium).

Conferences allow attendees from industry, government, scientific disciplines, etc. to meet and network and to learn about recent developments. Conference management relates to the tourism industry and can generate revenue and prestige for a community, town, country or region.

== See also ==
- Nonprofit management
- Step and repeat
- Time management
