= Singapore Tourism Board =

Government tourism promotion agency

Agency overview
- Formed: 1 January 1964; 62 years ago (as Singapore Tourist Promotion Board); 19 November 1997; 28 years ago (as Singapore Tourism Board)
- Jurisdiction: Government of Singapore
- Headquarters: Tourism Court, 1 Orchard Spring Lane, Singapore 247729
- Agency executives: Olivier Lim, Chairman; Melissa Ow, CEO
- Parent agency: Ministry of Energy, Trade and Industry
- Website: www.stb.gov.sg
- Agency ID: T08GB0059L

The Singapore Tourism Board (STB) is a statutory board under the Ministry of Energy, Trade and Industry of the Government of Singapore, tasked to promote the country's tourism industry.

== History ==
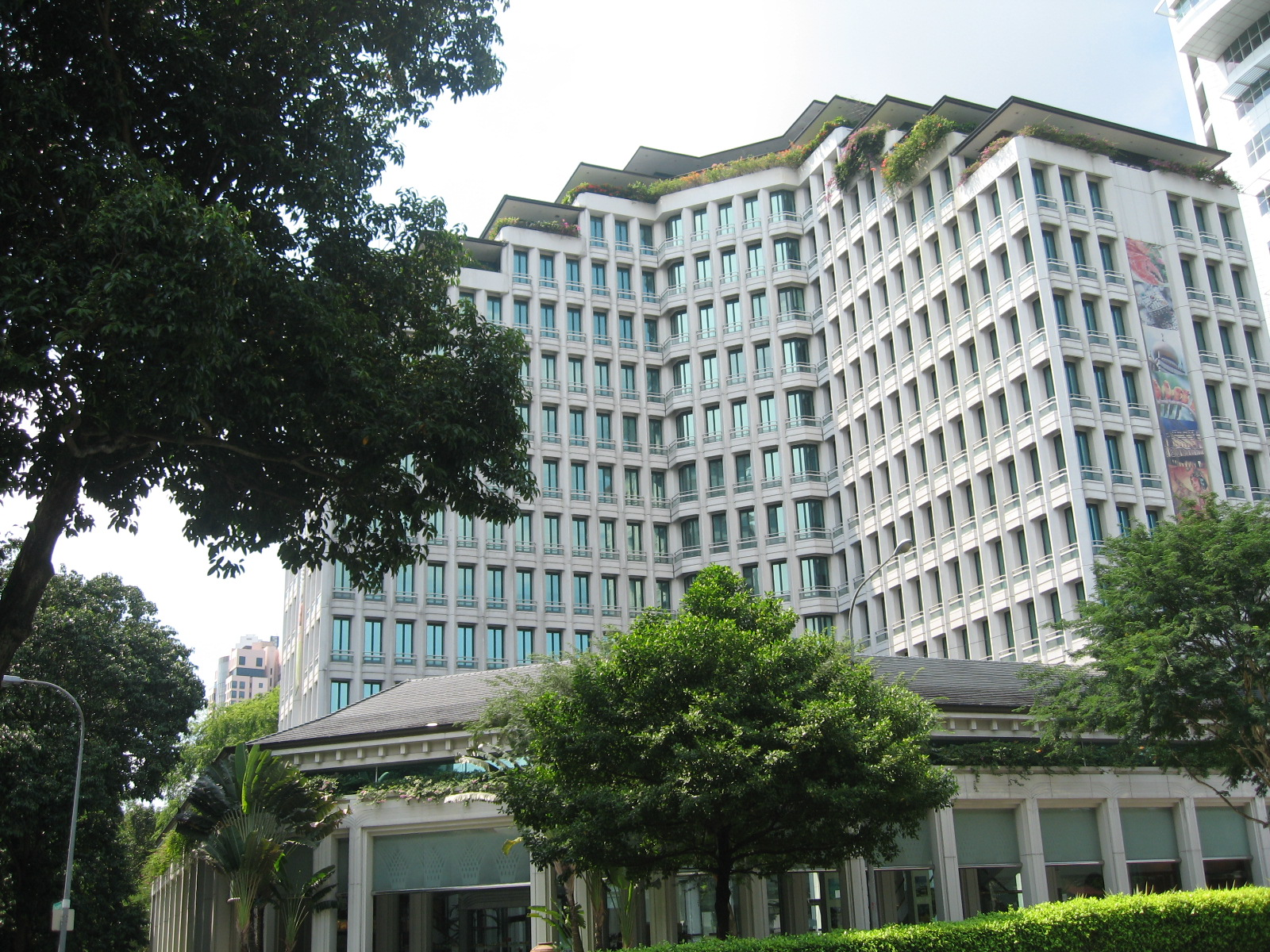
Tourism Court at Orchard Spring Lane, the headquarters of Singapore Tourism Board

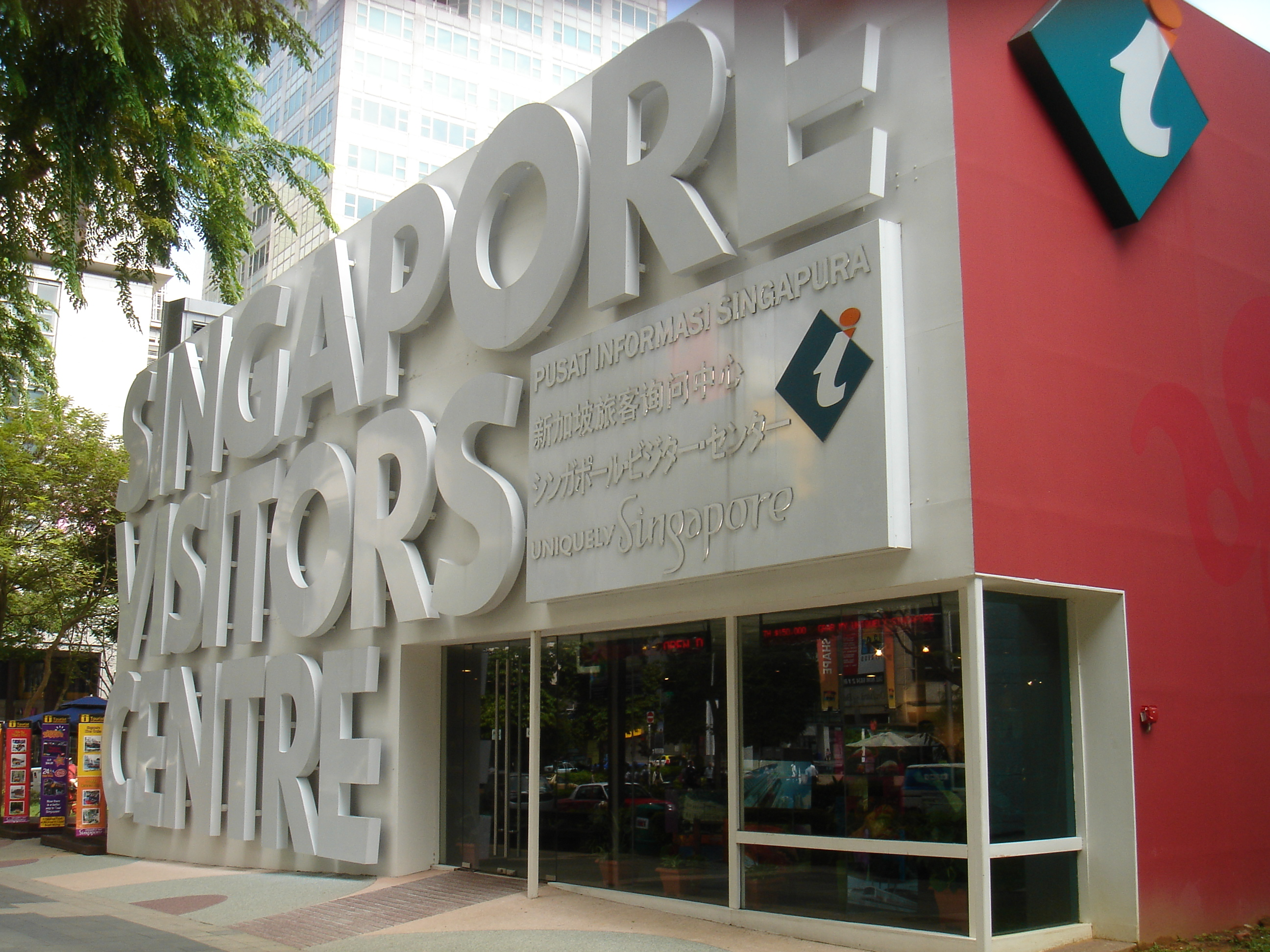
Singapore Visitors Centre along Orchard Road, providing tourism information for tourists in Singapore.

The board was first established on 1 January 1964 and was called the Singapore Tourist Promotion Board (Abbreviation: STPB). In that year, there were 91,000 visitors. The primary task of STPB was to coordinate the efforts of hotels, airlines and travel agents to develop the fledgling tourism industry of the country.

Later, STPB began to initiate new marketing ideas to promote Singapore's image abroad. The board created the Merlion, a symbol based on a Singapore mythical legend, that became an icon of the Singapore destination. The board has also been providing travel agent licensing and tourist guide training.

STPB actively promoted the development of infrastructure, including the building of hotels and tourist attractions such as the Jurong Bird Park and Sentosa which is now a popular resort island for both tourists and local visitors. The board also markets the city as a convention venue and organises events to attract visitors.

Throughout the 1960s to 70s, the tourism board ran multiple advertising campaigns aimed at drawing visitors from different countries and published monthly newsletters to promote multiple attractions in Singapore. The Merlion was also created as the Singapore Tourism Board's logo in 1964 and was used in promotional materials. The Merlion eventually became a well-known Singaporean icon and in 1972, a Merlion statue was erected in the Merlion Park.

In the 1980s, several historic and culturally significant areas such as Chinatown, Little India and Kampong Glam were earmarked for preservation. These places express Singapore's cultural diversity and became popular tourist destinations. The Singapore River underwent a major cleanup program and the areas along the river were developed for restaurants and other tourist amenities.

On 7 October 1997, the parliament passed the Tourist Promotion Board (Amendment) Bill to rename the STPB to Singapore Tourism Board. On 19 November 1997, STPB was renamed as Singapore Tourism Board.

== Mission ==
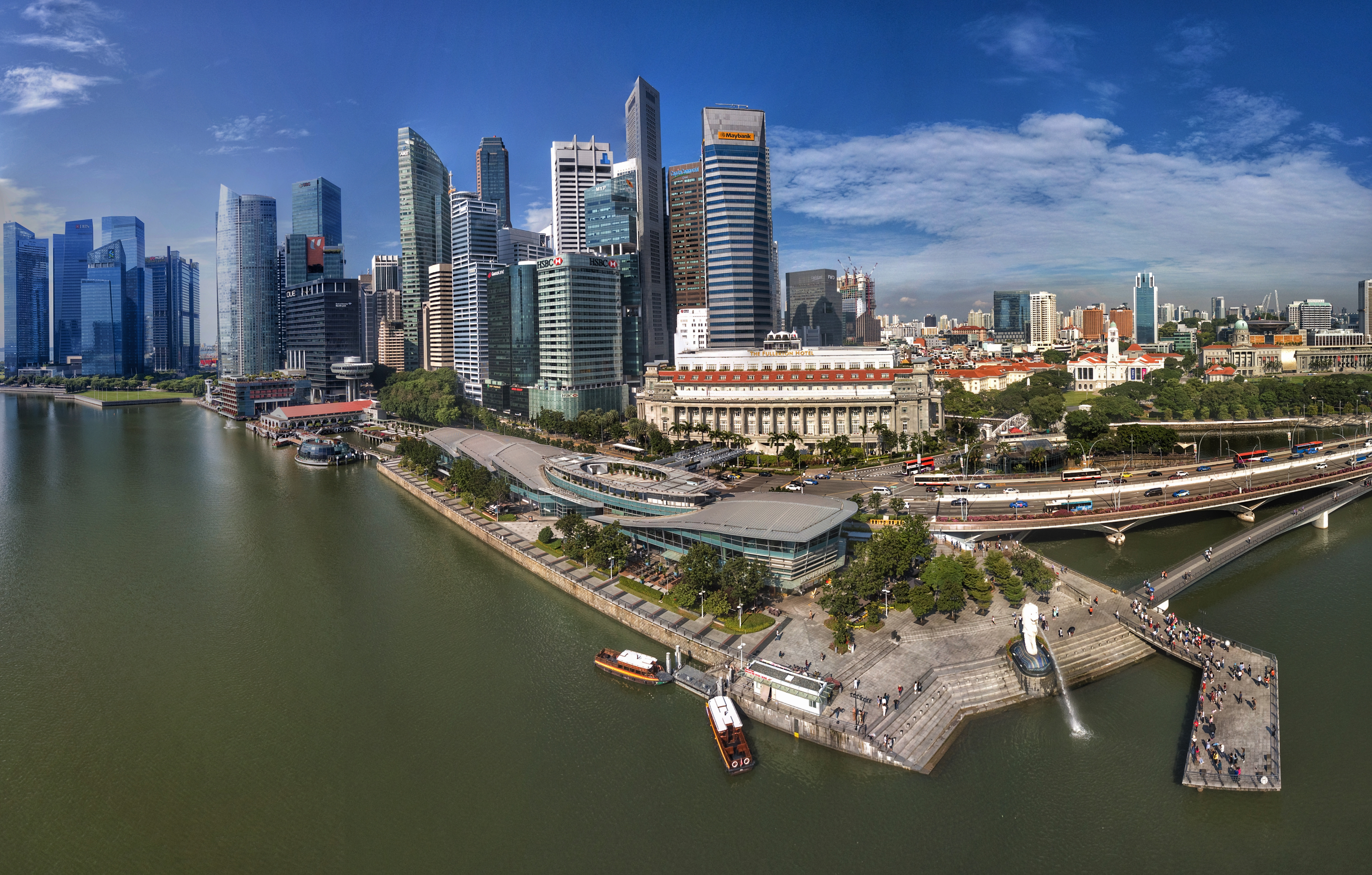
Aerial Panorama of Merlion Park and its surrounds

The board now oversees all aspects of tourism, including resource allocation and long-term strategic planning. It establishes offices around the globe to actively market the Singapore destination.

In the short term, the Singapore government has allocated S$905 million to STB for tourism developments until 2017. A third of this amount will be used to assist the industry to build manpower competencies through education and skills-upgrading initiatives, particularly in key areas such as conference management.

== Growth ==
Singapore tourism industry has grown rapidly since STPB was set up. In 2004, there were 8 million visitors. On 11 January 2005, Minister for Trade and Industry unveiled the Singapore Tourism Board’s (STB) targets to doubling visitor arrivals to 17 million by 2015.

In March 2010, the STB projected a 20–30% increase in visitor arrivals for the year due to the opening of Marina Bay Sands and Resorts World Sentosa. This coincided with other key events such as the Singapore Grand Prix and the inaugural Youth Olympic Games. New developments such as the International Cruise Terminal, Gardens by the Bay and Changi Motor Sports Hub are expected to be unveiled in the coming years.

== See also ==
- Tourism in Singapore
- Passion Made Possible
