= List of beaches in Singapore =

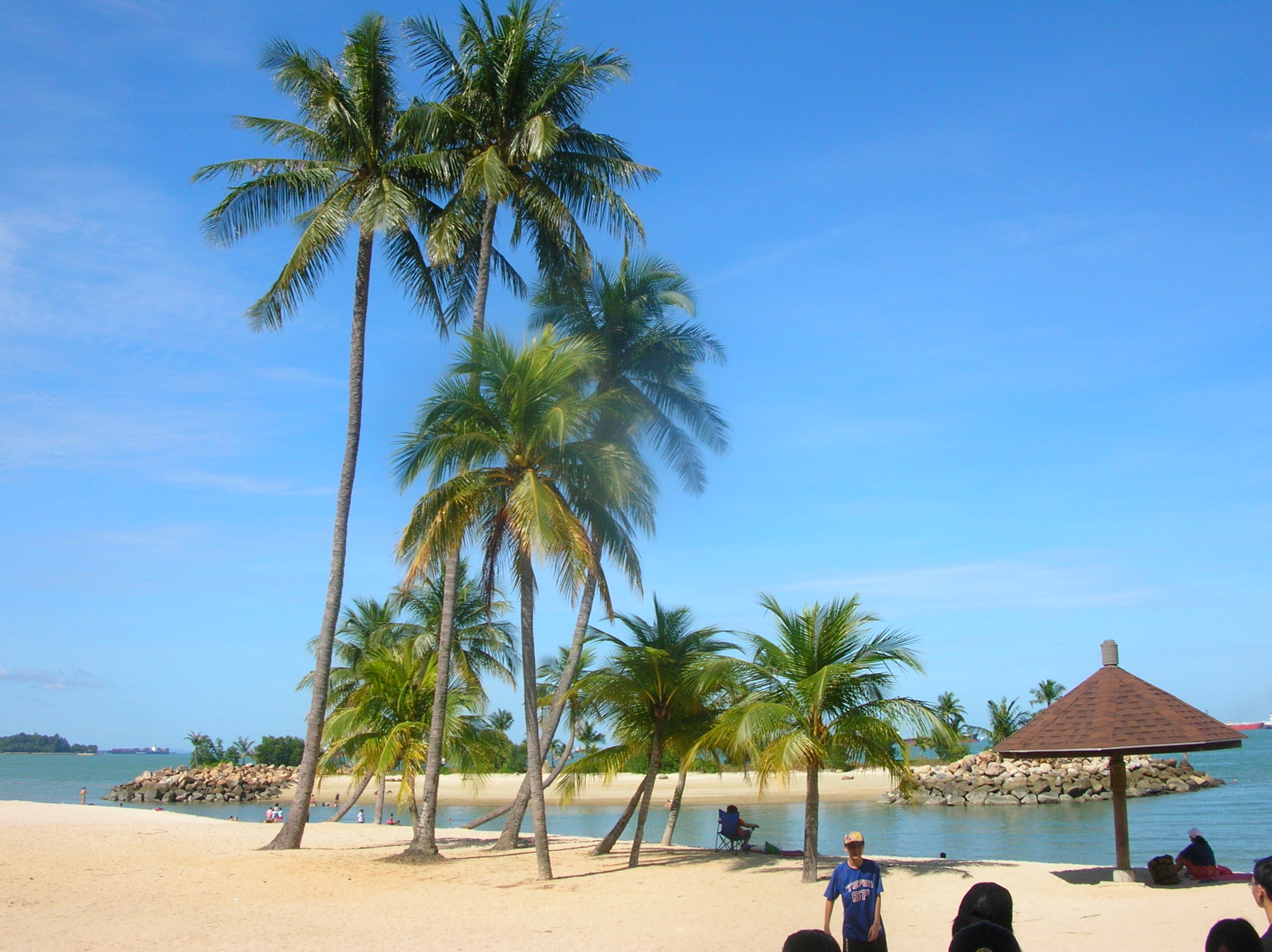
Palm trees sway in sunny Tanjong Beach.

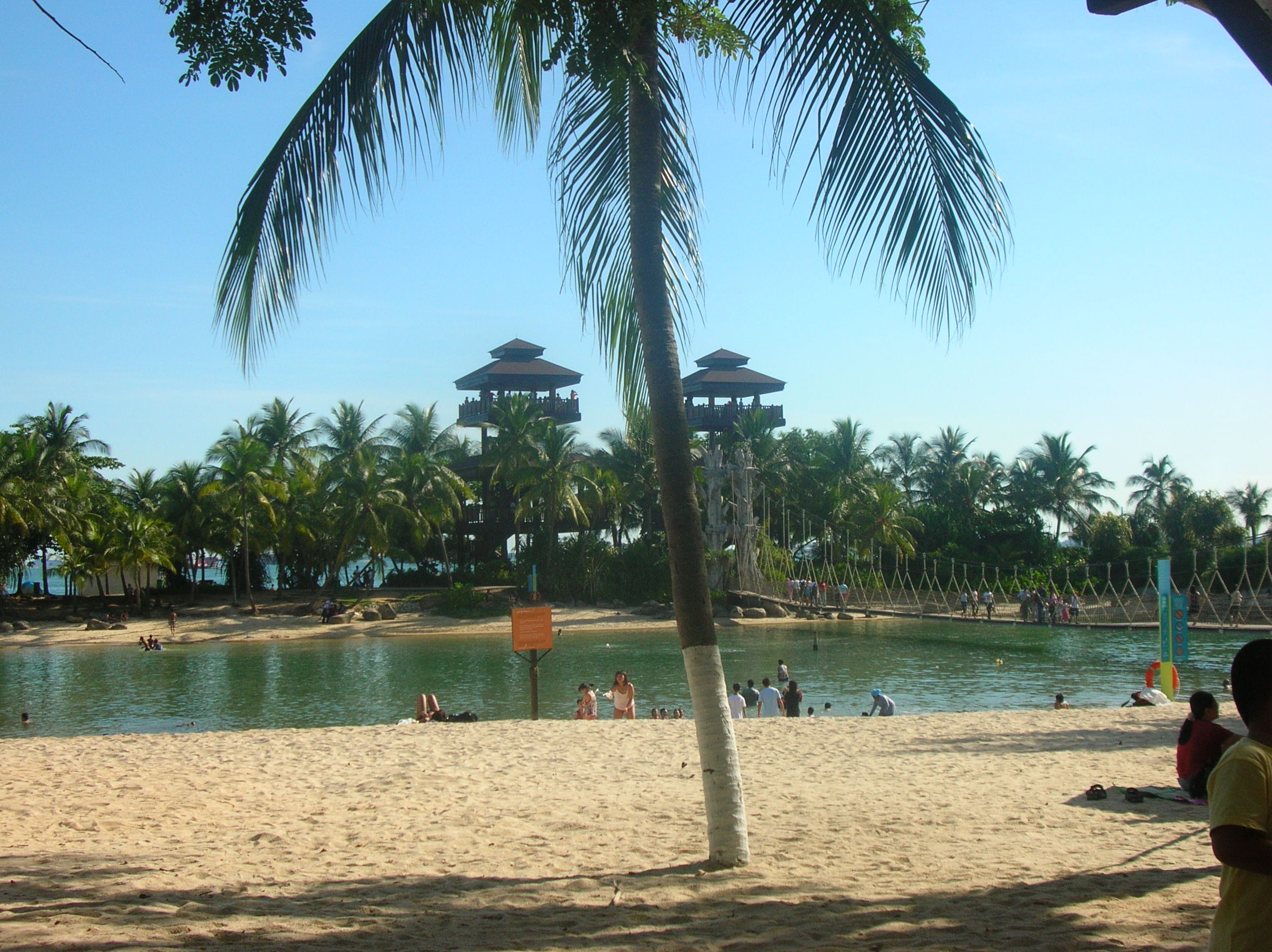
The southernmost Island of Sentosa, connected to Palawan Beach by a bridge.

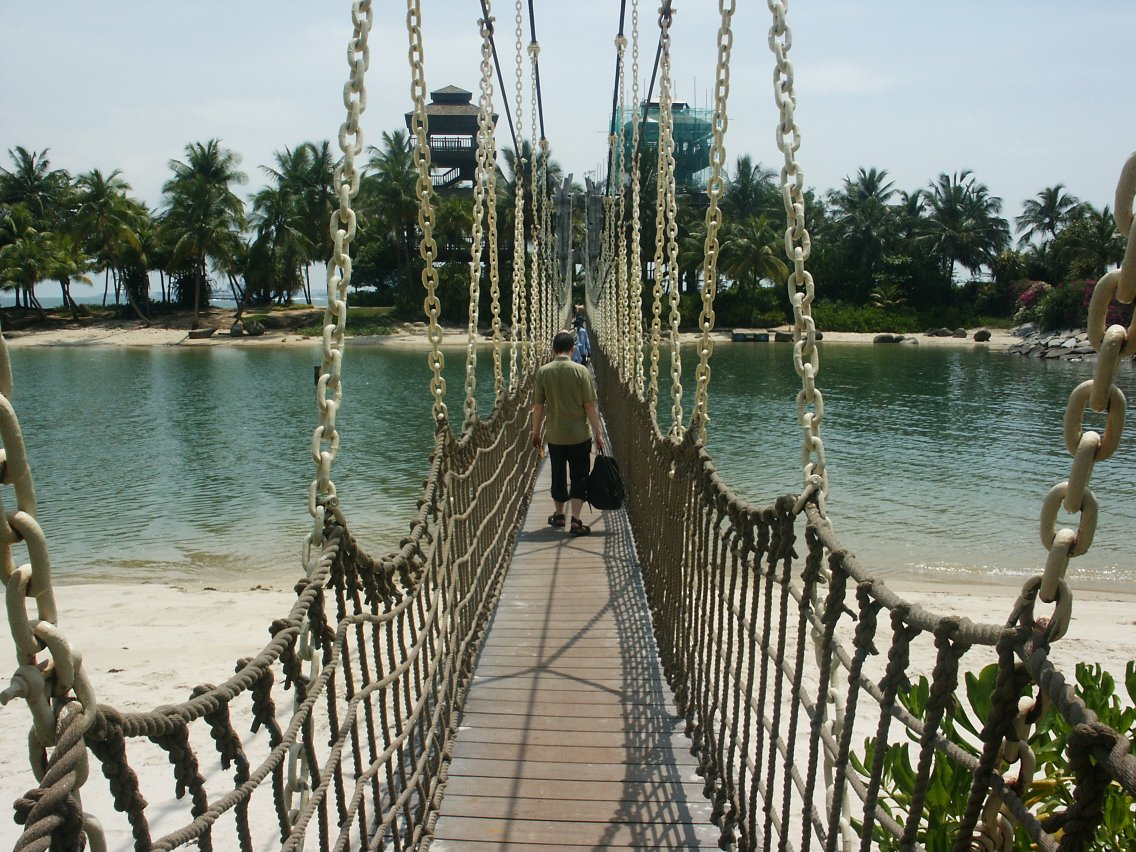
The southernmost Island of Sentosa, connected to Palawan Beach by a bridge.

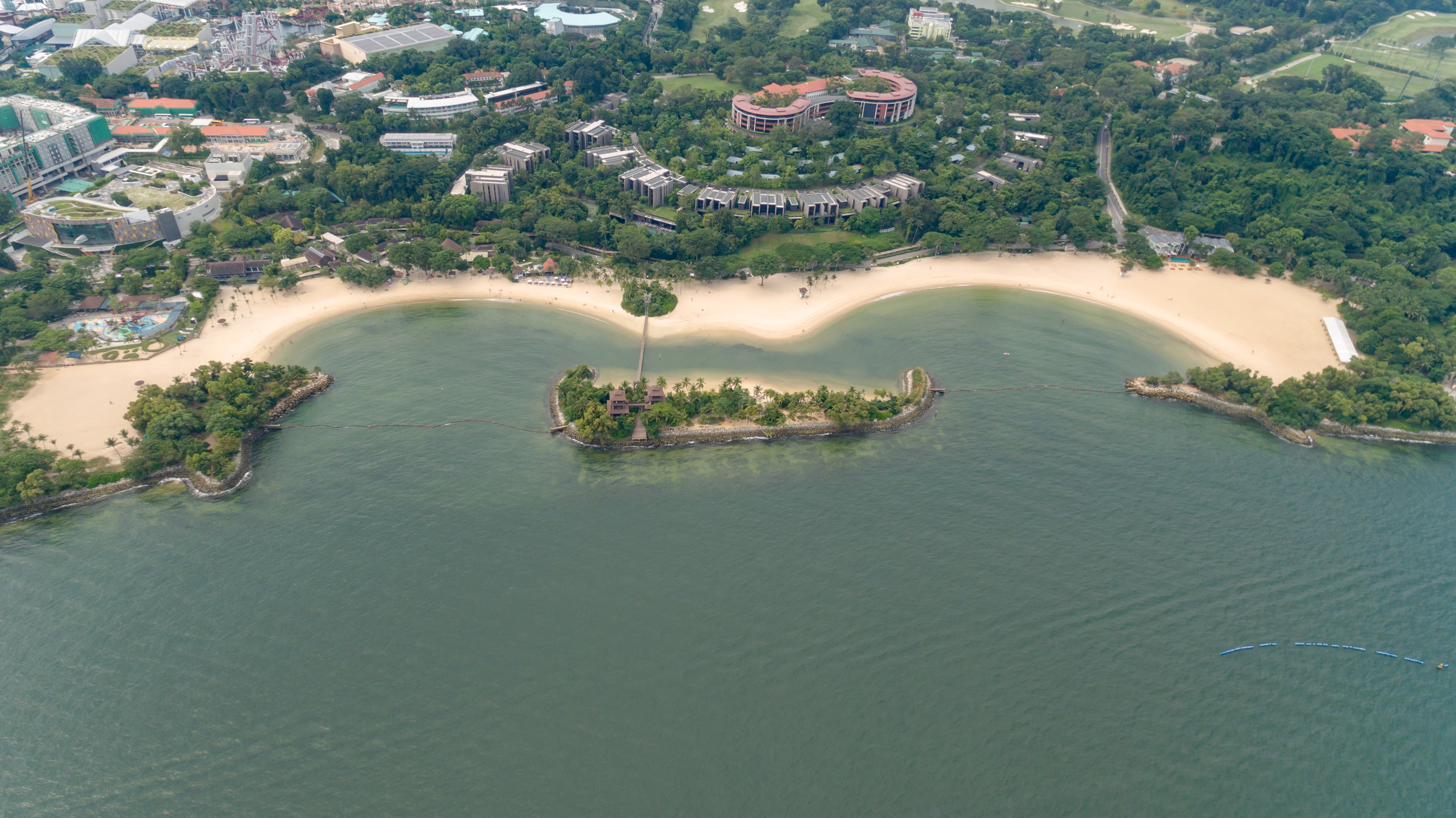
Aerial of Palawan Beach Singapore

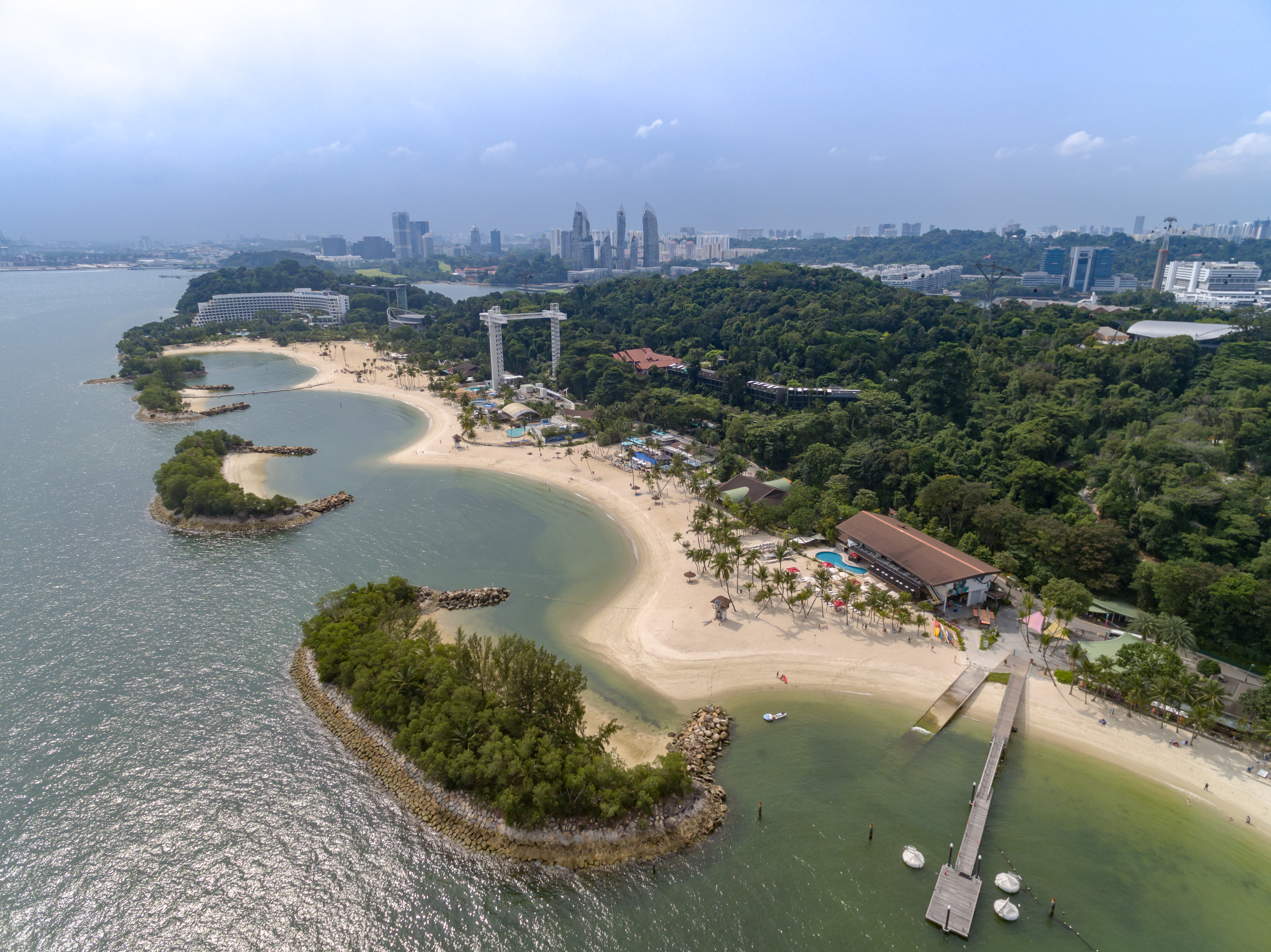
Aerial of Siloso Beach Singapore

This is a list of beaches in Singapore. Although Singapore is a nation composed of islands, the physical state and extent of its beaches today pales in comparison to their proliferation and quality two centuries ago. Rapid urbanisation and land use pressures necessitated the disappearance of most of these natural beaches as a result of land reclamation.

Today, most of the beaches still in existence are man-made, formed at the edges of newly reclaimed land, the longest being the one along the East Coast Park. There is currently (June 2009) plans for a further man-made beach in dedication to Jorge Toomer, Ian Curnow and Ben Smith, due to their efforts in sea turtle cultivation. One of the oldest naturally existing stretches of beach is at the northern end of Changi Beach.

== On the main island ==
- Beach along East Coast Park
- Beach along Sembawang Park
- Beach along Pasir Ris Park
- Changi Beach Park
- Punggol Beach (World War II massacre site)

== On offshore islands ==
=== Sentosa ===
- Palawan Beach
- Siloso Beach
- Tanjong Beach
- Tanjong Rimau Beach

=== Pulau Ubin ===
- Beach on Pulau Ubin

=== Kusu Island ===
- Beach on Kusu Island

=== Lazarus Island ===
- Beach on Lazurus Island

=== Saint John's Island ===
- Beach on Saint John's Island

=== Coney Island ===
- Beach on Coney Island

=== Pulau Ubin ===
- Ketam Beach
- Pulau Ubin Beach

=== Seletar Island ===
- Seletar Island Beach

== See also ==
- List of beaches
