= Tourism in Singapore =

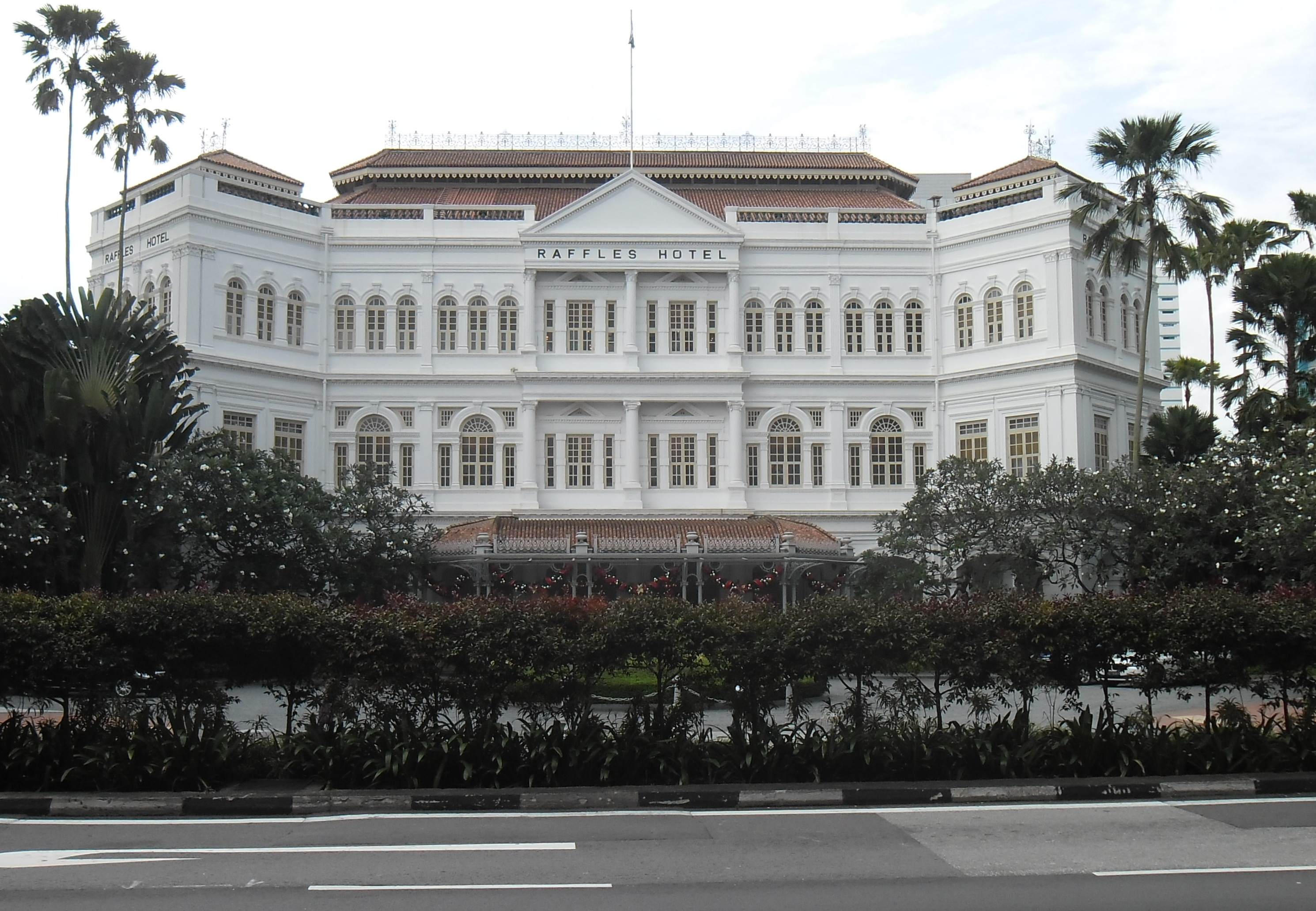
The historic Raffles Hotel is a national monument

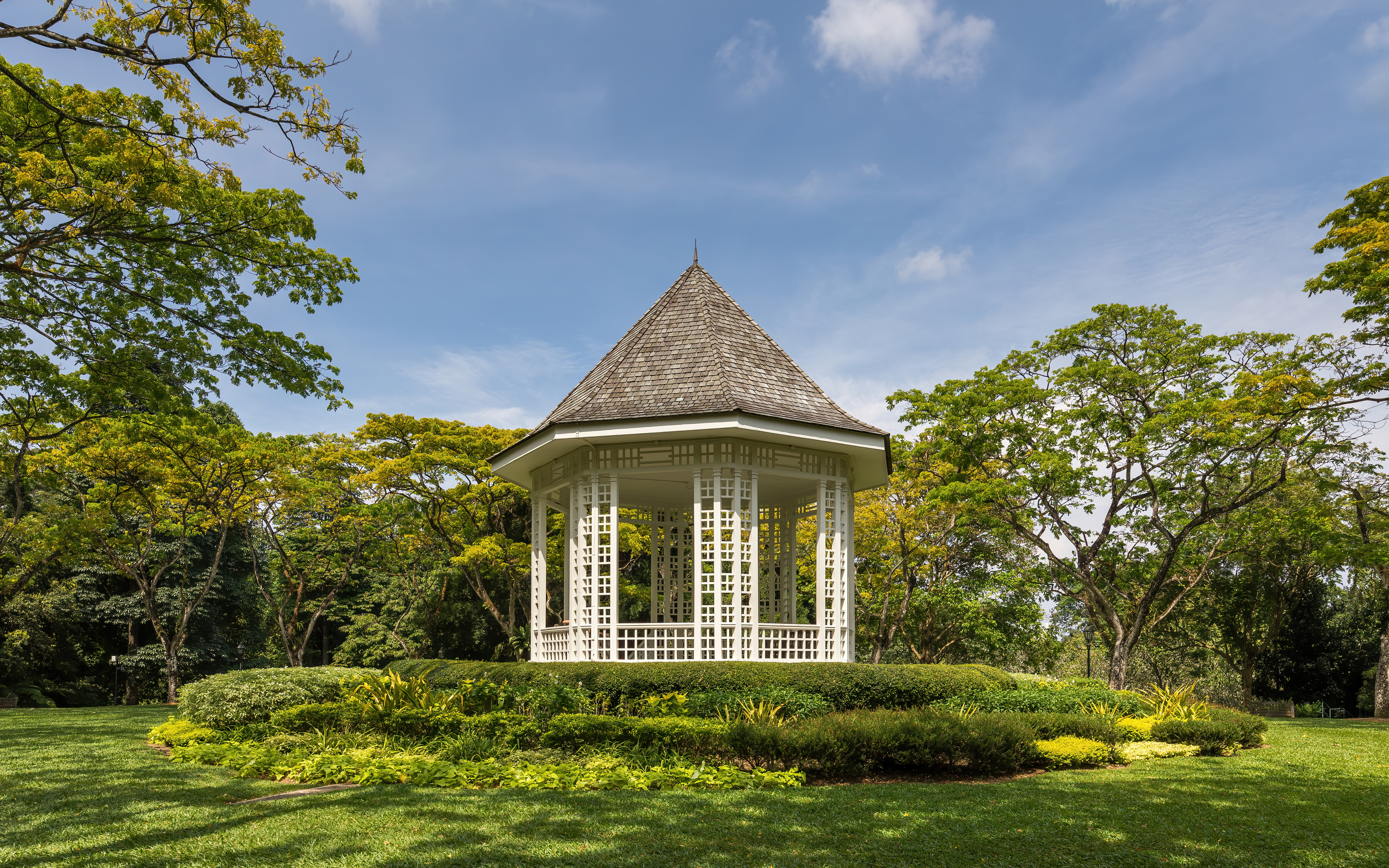
Built in 1930, the bandstand in the Singapore Botanic Gardens is one of its most recognisable structures.

Tourism in Singapore is a major industry and contributor to the Singaporean economy. In 2019, 19,114,002 tourists visited the country, which was the highest recorded number of arrivals since independence in 1965. In 2025, 16,912,283 international tourists visited Singapore, which was almost thrice the country's total population.

The country is marketed as a "City In Nature" destination by the Singapore Tourism Board under its 'Made in Singapore' campaign in 2023, with sustainable tourism as part of the campaign efforts. It also claims to be environmentally friendly, and maintains natural and heritage conservation programs. Along with this, it also has one of the world's lowest crime rates. As English is the dominant one of its four official languages, it is generally easier for tourists to understand when speaking to the local population of the country, for example, when shopping. Transport in Singapore exhaustively covers most, if not all public venues in Singapore, which increases convenience for tourists. This includes the well-known Mass Rapid Transit (MRT) system. Singapore is the 5th most visited city in the world, and 2nd in Asia-Pacific.

The Travel and Tourism Competitiveness Report 2017 ranks Singapore 13th out of 136 countries overall, which was the third best in Asia only behind Japan (ranked 4th) and Hong Kong (ranked 11th). The report ranks Singapore's business environment, international openness, also travel and tourism policy and enabling conditions as the best in the world (ranked 1st). However, the island nation scored rather low in natural and cultural resources sub-index (ranked 40th).

== History ==
In January 1964, the Singapore Tourism Board (then known as Singapore Tourist Promotion Board), was set up to market Singapore, then a state of Malaysia, as a destination for tourists, to develop and to regulate the tourism industry. The Government of Singapore had aimed to create more jobs, income and to facilitate trade within Singapore, through the development of the tourism industry. Throughout the 1960s to 70s, the tourism board ran multiple advertising campaigns aimed at drawing visitors from different countries and published monthly newsletters to promote multiple attractions in Singapore. The Merlion was also created as the Singapore Tourism Board's logo in 1964 and was used in promotional materials. The Merlion eventually became a well-known Singaporean icon and in 1972, a Merlion statue was erected in the Merlion Park. In 1977, there was a record of 1.5 million visitors to the country and tourist receipts were estimated to be S$628 million as compared to 522,000 visitors and S$269 million in tourist expenditure in 1970.

Throughout the 1980s to 1990s, the tourism board aimed to market the culture of Singapore to visitors through the renewal of infrastructure in historical areas such as Chinatown and development of new venues for hosting concerts and conventions. In 2005, the government of Singapore announced the development of 2 integrated resorts in Marina South and Sentosa. Plans to develop Gardens by the Bay were also announced in that same year. The resorts were part of plans to boost the tourism industry which had been facing intense competition from other destinations around the region, particularly from nearby Bangkok and Hong Kong, which has since also considered legalisation of casinos in the wake of initiatives in Singapore. Marina Bay Sands was officially opened on 23 June 2010, while Gardens by the Bay opened on June 29, 2012 and Resorts World Sentosa was officially opened on December 7, 2012.

== Tourism statistics ==
Visitor arrivals to Singapore has been increasing since the country's independence in 1965. As compared to a total of 99,000 visitors recorded in 1965, Singapore attracted a record-high of approximately 19.1 million visitors in 2019 with receipts at S$27.7 billion, according to preliminary figures by the Singapore Tourism Board. The total number of visitors increased by 3.3% from 2018, with increased in arrivals in visitors from China, Indonesia and Australia, while visitors from India and Malaysia dropped 2% and 3% respectively. Tourism receipts increased 2.8% from 2018, with most visitors spending in the sightseeing, entertainment and gaming (S$1,593 million), shopping (S$1,457 million), accommodation (S$1,439 million) and food & beverage (S$649 million) categories.

In 2020, due to the COVID-19 pandemic, visitor statistics in Singapore fell 85.7% and tourism receipts fell 82.6% (S$4.8 million) from 2019. A total of 2,700,000 visitors were recorded that year, which was the first time visitor statistics fell since the decrease in arrivals in 2014. Visitors coming into Singapore for short-term visits were also barred from entering and transiting from March 23, 2020, to October 19, 2021.

In 2021, visitors arrivals further dipped to 330,059 visitors, which was an 88% decrease as compared to 2020. In December 2021, amid the spread of the highly transmissible COVID-19 Omicron variant, many countries still had travel restrictions, with some governments banning travel completely to curb transmission. Travel into Singapore for short-term visits were only resumed in September 2021 with the introduction of vaccinated travel lanes. In 2024, the country recorded a total of 16,526,344 visitors, an increase of 21% compared to 2023, with tourism receipts reaching S$29.8 billion.

In 2025, Singapore welcomed 16,912,283 international visitor arrivals (a 2.3% increase compared to 2024), while tourism receipts reached a record high of S$32.8 billion, representing a 10% year-on-year increase from 2024.

=== General trends ===
Year	Tourism Arrivals	Percentage change from previous period
1965	99,000	
1970	579,000	488.1%
1975	1,324,000	128.6%
1980	2,562,000	92%
1985	3,031,000	18.3%
1990	5,323,000	75.6%
1995	7,137,000	34.1%
2000	7,691,399	7.8%
2005	8,943,029	16.3%
2010	11,638,663	30.1%
2015	15,231,469	30.9%
2020	2,742,443	−82%
2025	16,912,283	517%

=== Recent years ===
Year	Tourism Arrivals	Percentage change from previous year
2015	15,231,469	0.9%
2016	16,402,593	7.7%
2017	17,422,826	6.2%
2018	18,506,619	6.2%
2019	19,114,002	3.3%
2020	2,742,443	−85.7%
2021	330,059	−88%
2022	6,305,744	1,810.5%
2023	13,610,404	115.7%
2024	16,526,312	21.5%
2025	16,912,283	2.3%

=== Top markets 2000–2010 ===
Source: Singapore Tourism Analytics Network

Country or territory	2000	2001	2002	2003	2004	2005	2006	2007	2008	2009	2010
Indonesia	1,313,316	1,364,380	1,393,020	1,341,747	1,765,324	1,813,569	1,922,217	1,962,055	1,765,429	1,745,330	2,305,149
China	434,336	497,398	670,099	568,510	880,259	857,814	1,037,201	1,113,956	1,078,742	936,747	1,171,337
Malaysia	564,750	578,719	548,659	439,437	537,336	577,987	634,303	645,774	647,480	764,309	1,036,918
Australia	510,347	550,681	538,408	392,906	561,163	620,255	691,632	768,490	833,156	830,299	880,486
India	346,360	339,828	375,697	309,487	471,244	583,590	658,902	748,728	778,303	725,624	828,903
Japan	929,895	755,766	723,431	434,087	598,840	588,535	594,406	594,514	571,040	489,987	528,817
Philippines	181,032	190,630	195,564	176,585	245,918	319,971	386,119	418,775	418,938	432,072	544,344
Hong Kong	285,975	276,157	265,970	226,260	271,691	313,831	291,474	302,110	278,115	294,420	387,552
Thailand	246,750	260,958	263,866	235,826	341,989	379,040	356,367	353,416	333,905	317,905	430,022
United States	385,585	343,805	327,648	250,678	333,156	371,440	399,786	408,885	396,631	370,704	416,990
South Korea	354,353	359,083	371,050	261,403	361,083	364,206	454,722	464,292	423,018	271,987	360,673
United Kingdom	444,976	460,018	458,528	387,982	457,262	467,154	488,167	495,693	492,933	469,756	461,714
Vietnam	31,837	34,633	40,652	44,420	105,803	150,626	165,105	203,210	239,299	265,414	322,853
Taiwan	290,904	222,087	209,321	144,942	182,443	213,959	219,463	208,156	175,924	156,761	191,173
Germany	169,408	166,981	157,510	121,376	142,371	154,779	161,125	164,900	175,280	183,681	209,231

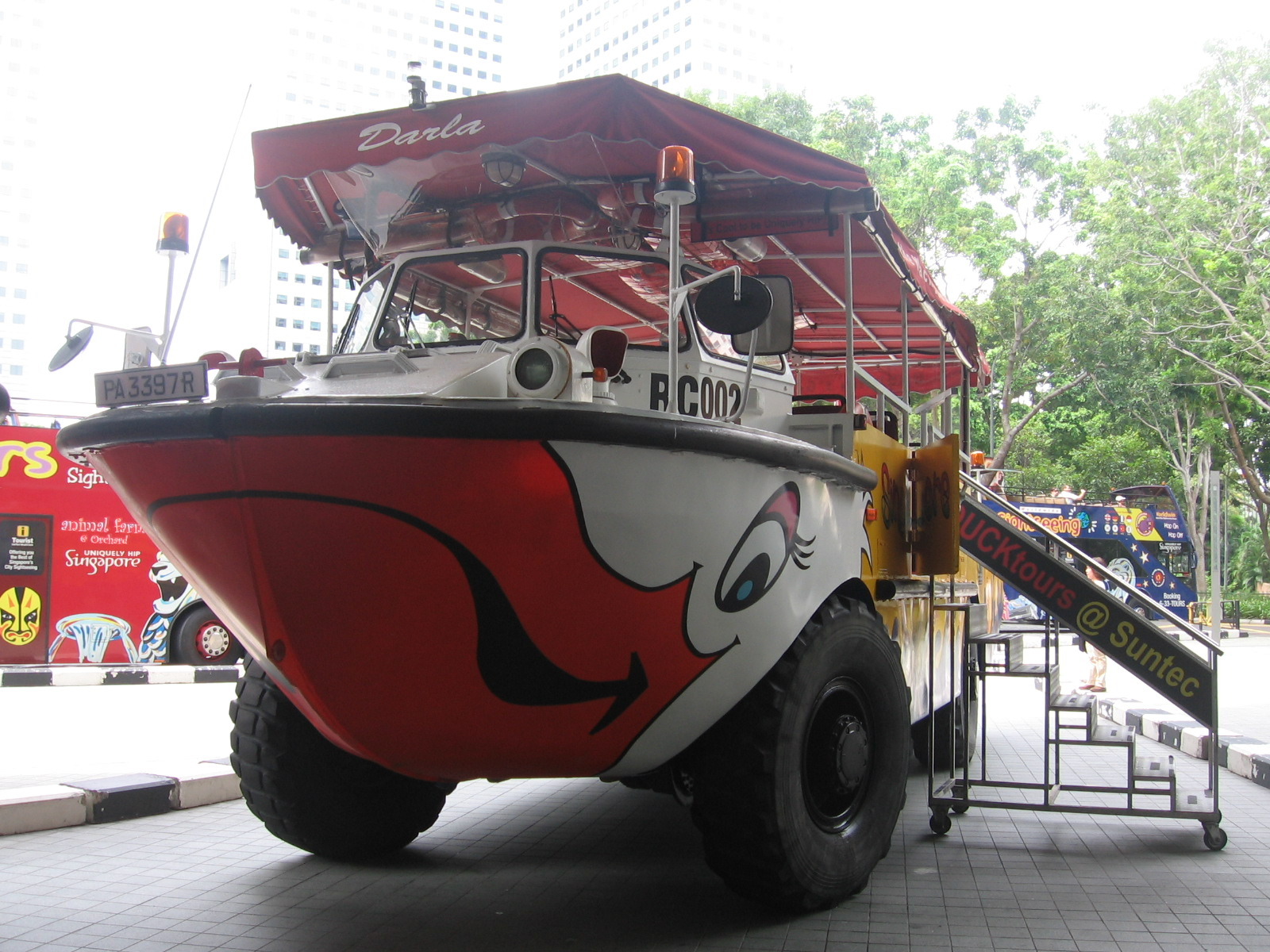
Singapore Ducktours (part of RATP Group)

=== Top markets 2011–2020 ===
Source: Singapore Tourism Analytics Network, Singapore Tourism Board

Country or territory	2011	2012	2013	2014	2015	2016	2017	2018	2019	2020
Indonesia	2,592,222	2,837,537	3,088,859	3,025,178	2,731,690	2,893,614	2,954,384	3,021,429	3,109,000	457,027
China	1,577,522	2,034,177	2,269,870	1,722,380	2,106,164	2,863,582	3,226,929	3,416,475	3,627,000	357,292
Australia	956,039	1,050,373	1,125,179	1,074,878	1,043,568	1,027,309	1,081,987	1,107,215	1,143,000	206,238
India	868,991	894,993	933,553	943,636	1,013,986	1,097,186	1,272,069	1,442,242	1,418,000	175,522
Malaysia	1,140,935	1,231,686	1,280,942	1,233,035	1,171,077	1,151,480	1,168,356	1,253,992	1,221,000	153,650
United Kingdom	442,611	446,497	461,459	451,931	473,810	489,205	518,903	588,863	607,000	133,336
Japan	656,417	757,116	832,845	824,741	789,179	783,721	792,813	829,664	884,000	125,879
United States	440,576	477,213	491,946	484,912	499,509	516,276	565,250	643,162	729,000	123,182
Philippines	677,723	656,804	687,794	676,481	673,374	691,555	736,456	778,135	829,000	97,881
Germany	219,952	252,433	251,560	263,513	286,732	328,762	342,336	356,797	381,000	95,563
South Korea	414,879	445,184	471,768	536,975	577,082	566,503	631,359	629,451	646,000	89,522
Vietnam	332,231	366,234	380,495	424,408	418,266	469,409	531,359	591,600	592,000	74,424
Thailand	472,708	477,654	497,409	506,509	516,409	546,384	531,307	545,601	528,000	63,622
Taiwan	238,488	282,203	350,308	337,431	378,026	394,174	395,549	422,935	429,000	61,887
Hong Kong	464,375	472,167	539,810	631,029	609,888	537,964	465,769	473,113	489,000	58,976

=== Top markets 2021–present ===
Source: Singapore Tourism Analytics Network

Country or territory	2021	2022	2023	2024	2025	Q3/2026
China	88,250	130,870	1,128,440	3,082,218	3,100,144	2,616,967
Indonesia	33,460	1,104,160	1,872,030	2,489,342	2,439,829	1,656,239
Malaysia	24,220	590,960	891,890	1,185,127	1,275,378	933,821
Australia	10,050	565,680	884,270	1,174,372	1,267,428	926,569
India	54,380	686,470	887,260	1,197,107	1,207,162	868,486
United States	10,960	318,450	516,040	692,466	716,909	539,886
Japan	5,920	132,110	359,050	573,236	627,512	517,970
Philippines	11,490	381,990	568,380	779,078	726,065	494,278
United Kingdom	8,550	226,740	384,060	579,958	587,356	409,784
South Korea	7,130	217,530	488,370	594,898	587,010	398,282
Taiwan	3,410	65,050	289,980	403,367	422,688	372,857
Thailand	4,380	283,430	393,210	364,741	386,488	270,328
Vietnam	3,440	312,710	406,410	393,184	344,286	265,311
Germany	5,410	130,590	249,770	349,181	356,380	261,559
Hong Kong	5,430	129,050	267,910	305,842	337,647	247,636
France	4,210	86,090	142,140	179,365	196,657	149,908
Myanmar	10,020	85,290	100,550	134,916	169,642	149,435
New Zealand	595	57,080	115,910	144,733	165,080	123,447
Canada	1,690	55,020	102,970	126,971	153,785	113,701
Bangladesh	17,900	102,990	98,730	121,760	156,959	105,295
Italy	1,230	33,120	63,710	86,843	99,866	78,693
Netherlands	1,960	51,180	76,600	89,291	97,505	74,934
Switzerland	1,320	36,290	62,050	83,223	95,812	69,412
United Arab Emirates	940	42,970	66,100	83,630	102,534	66,227
Spain	777	30,460	49,640	64,685	77,999	53,525
Russia	388	9,800	46,460	54,891	69,167	51,053
Sri Lanka	1,470	35,520	44,260	56,880	68,732	50,879
Brunei	1,250	31,640	47,580	49,495	56,125	37,937
Belgium	355	14,364	28,920	36,762	38,152	29,801
South Africa	159	13,020	19,910	24,455	35,983	25,512
Denmark	730	16,410	23,590	27,992	31,149	23,271
Sweden	545	13,500	21,330	26,027	33,360	22,814
Finland	355	9,780	15,580	23,214	26,962	20,037
Norway	425	12,690	20,270	22,998	25,508	19,675
Ireland	263	11,086	22,743	26,134	28,205	19,649
Israel	704	11,940	14,040	16,011	23,825	18,644
Saudi Arabia	196	7,170	18,620	26,396	30,935	17,903
Pakistan	195	10,560	14,690	17,224	22,590	14,978
Mauritius	35	2,410	4,010	4,788	6,240	3,898
Kuwait	38	3,650	7,470	7,685	7,924	2,598
Egypt	94	1,644	2,769	2,967	3,500	2,024

Note: Rows highlighted indicate members of the Association of Southeast Asian Nations (ASEAN).

=== Challenges to the tourism industry ===
==== Tourism impact of COVID-19 pandemic (2020-2021) ====
In early 2020, COVID-19 pandemic has affected the numbers of foreign visitors across the country. In February 2020, Indonesia raised its travel alert for Singapore to level yellow, urging Indonesian citizens to take extra precautions when they visit the city-state. Indonesia is among the top source of foreign visitors to Singapore. It is predicted that the number of visitors could fall between 25 and 30 per cent from the 2019 figure.

On September 16th 2020, Trade and Industry Minister Chan Chun Sing announced that all adult Singaporeans will get $100 tourism vouchers, accessible digitally via Singpass, to be used from December 2020 to June 2021. The $320 million SingapoRediscovers Vouchers scheme is part of the government's effort to prop up the tourism sector, which has been decimated by travel restrictions amidst COVID-19 pandemic.

In April 2022 same day as the U.K., Ireland, Finland, Malaysia and other countries, COVID-19 tourism impact in Singapore was officially ended by early April 2022 as the country moves towards the endemic phase.

== Popular tourist destinations ==
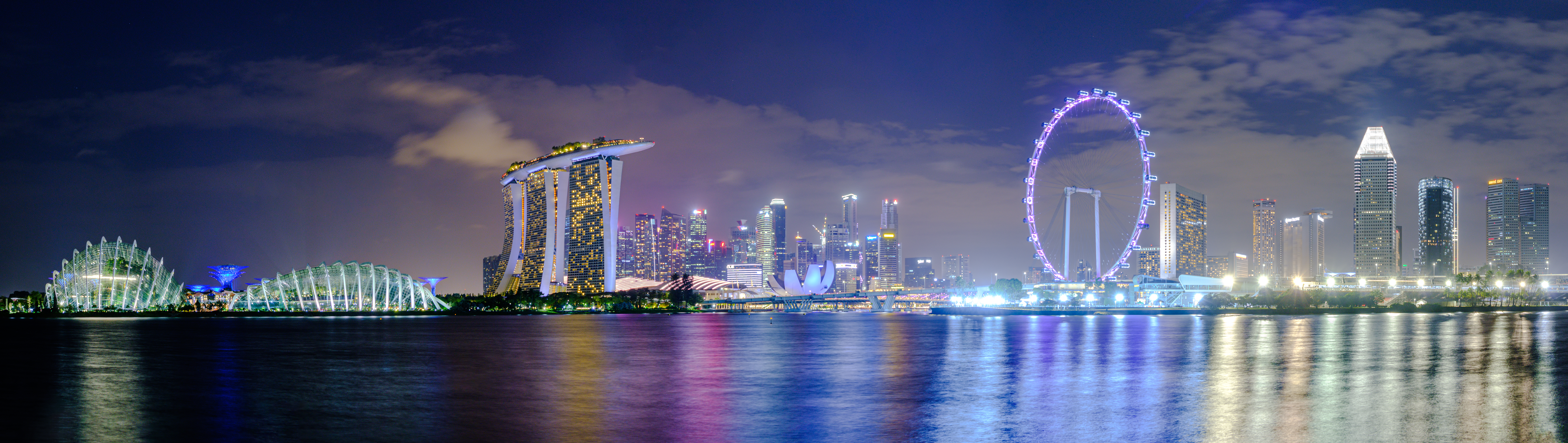
Skyline of Singapore featuring Gardens by the Bay, Marina Bay Sands and the Singapore Flyer within the Marina Bay area

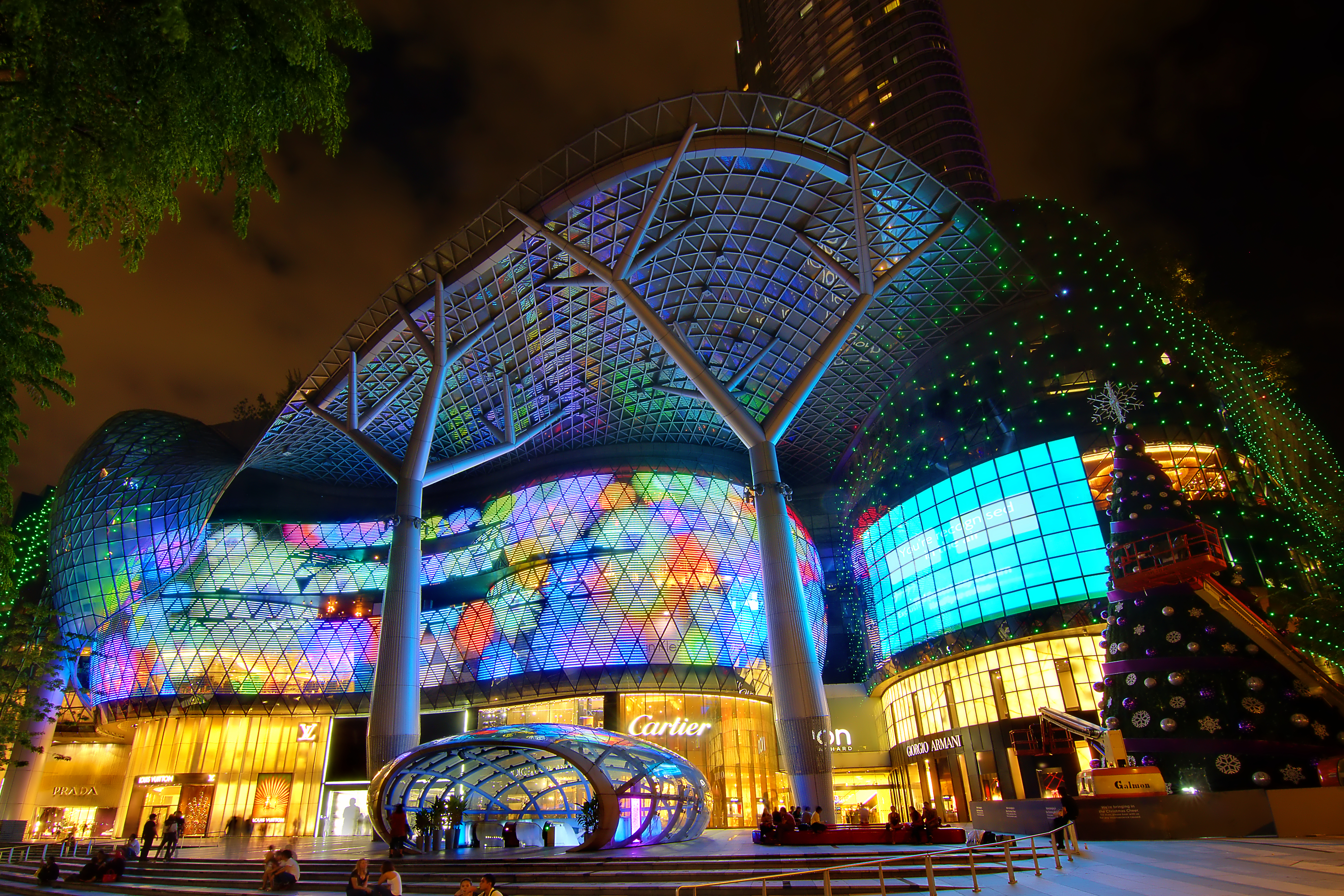
ION Orchard in Orchard Road

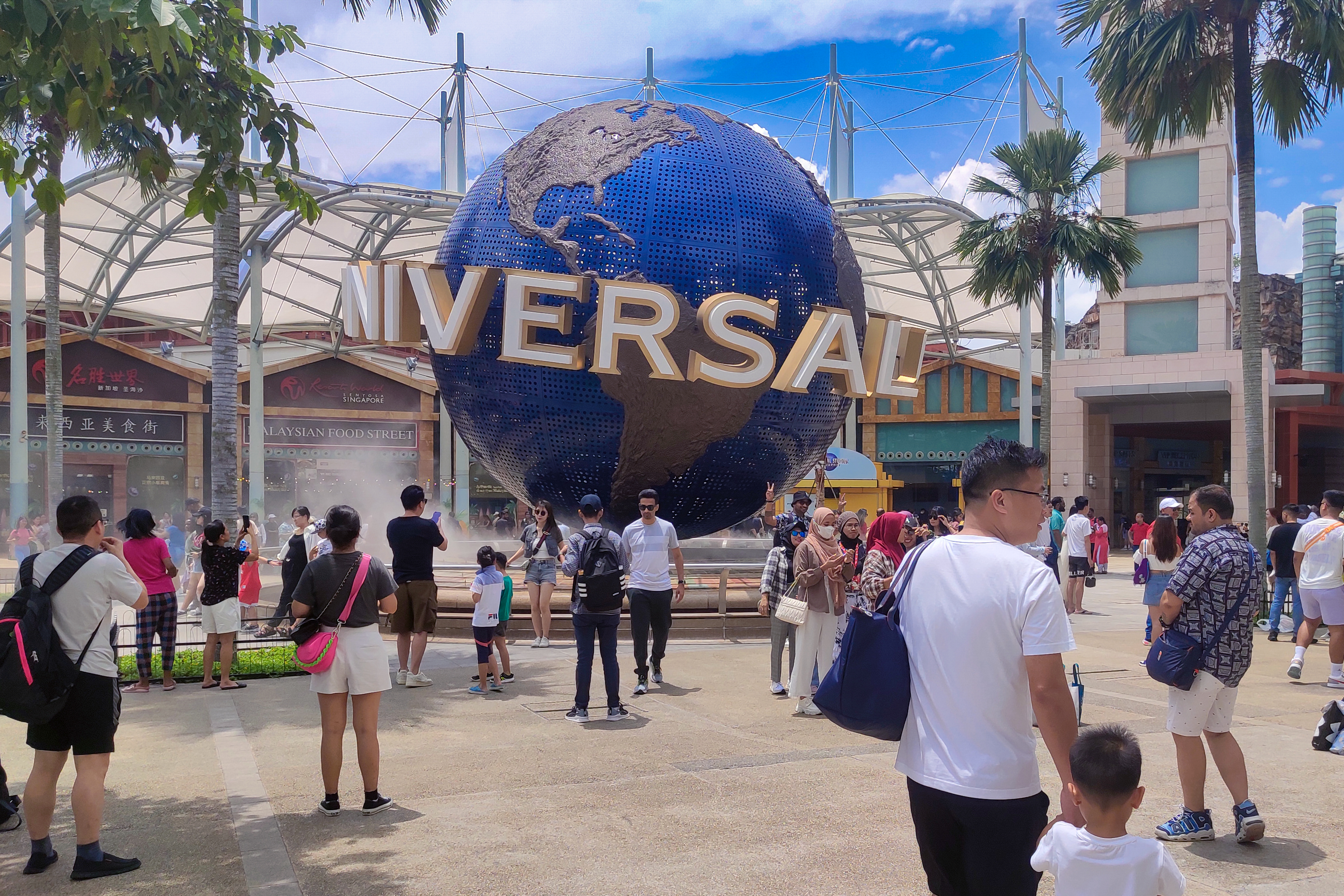
Universal Studios Singapore's globe located at the entrance of the park

Located within the Marina Bay area, the Merlion, Gardens by the Bay, the Singapore Flyer and Marina Bay Sands stand among Singapore's most iconic landmarks, prominently defining the city's skyline and serving as symbols of its modern architectural and cultural identity. Other popular tourist attractions include the Singapore Zoo, River Wonders and Night Safari. Singapore's Changi Airport also offers a range of attractions within its premises, with Jewel Changi Airport standing out as the crown jewel. In 2024, Jewel welcomed a record 80 million visitors — the highest annual attendance since its opening in 2019.

Situated in the southern region of Singapore, Sentosa Island remains one of the country's most popular resort destinations, boasting a number notable landmarks. Among them is Fort Siloso, a historic coastal fortification built to defend against Japanese forces during World War II. Visitors can explore the fort's collection of wartime artillery, ranging from smaller-caliber guns to a 16 pound (7 kg) cannon.

Sentosa is also home to major attractions such as Universal Studios Singapore and Skyline Luge Singapore, a luge where guests navigate a purpose-built track while lying supine and steering by shifting their weight or pulling on the sled's straps. As part of Singapore's broader initiative to enhance its tourism appeal, two of Sentosa's marquee attractions are undergoing significant upgrades. The S.E.A Aquarium, which first opened in 2012, was under refurbishment and was rebranded as the Singapore Oceanarium. It was re-opened to the public on July 24, 2025 after its expansion. Similarly, Universal Studios Singapore recently unveiled a new attraction in February 2025 as part of its ongoing development.

Beyond Sentosa, Singapore continues to broaden its tourism offerings in other regions. In the north region, the Mandai Wildlife Reserve has introduced several new highlights. Bird Paradise, a sprawling aviary which is dedicated towards exposing the public to as much species and varieties of birds from around the world as possible, including a flock of one thousand flamingos, opened in May 2023, while Rainforest Wild Asia, an adventure-driven zoological park, welcomed its first visitors in March 2025. Complementing these attractions is the newly launched Mandai Rainforest Resort, a rainforest-themed eco-resort that began operations in April 2025.

Other prominent areas includes the four-ethnic quarters of Singapore, Chinatown, Geylang Serai, Kampong Glam and Little India and also Orchard Road, an upscale shopping area, with numerous department stores, shopping malls, restaurants, and coffeehouses located in its vicinity.

== Cultural and historical landmarks ==
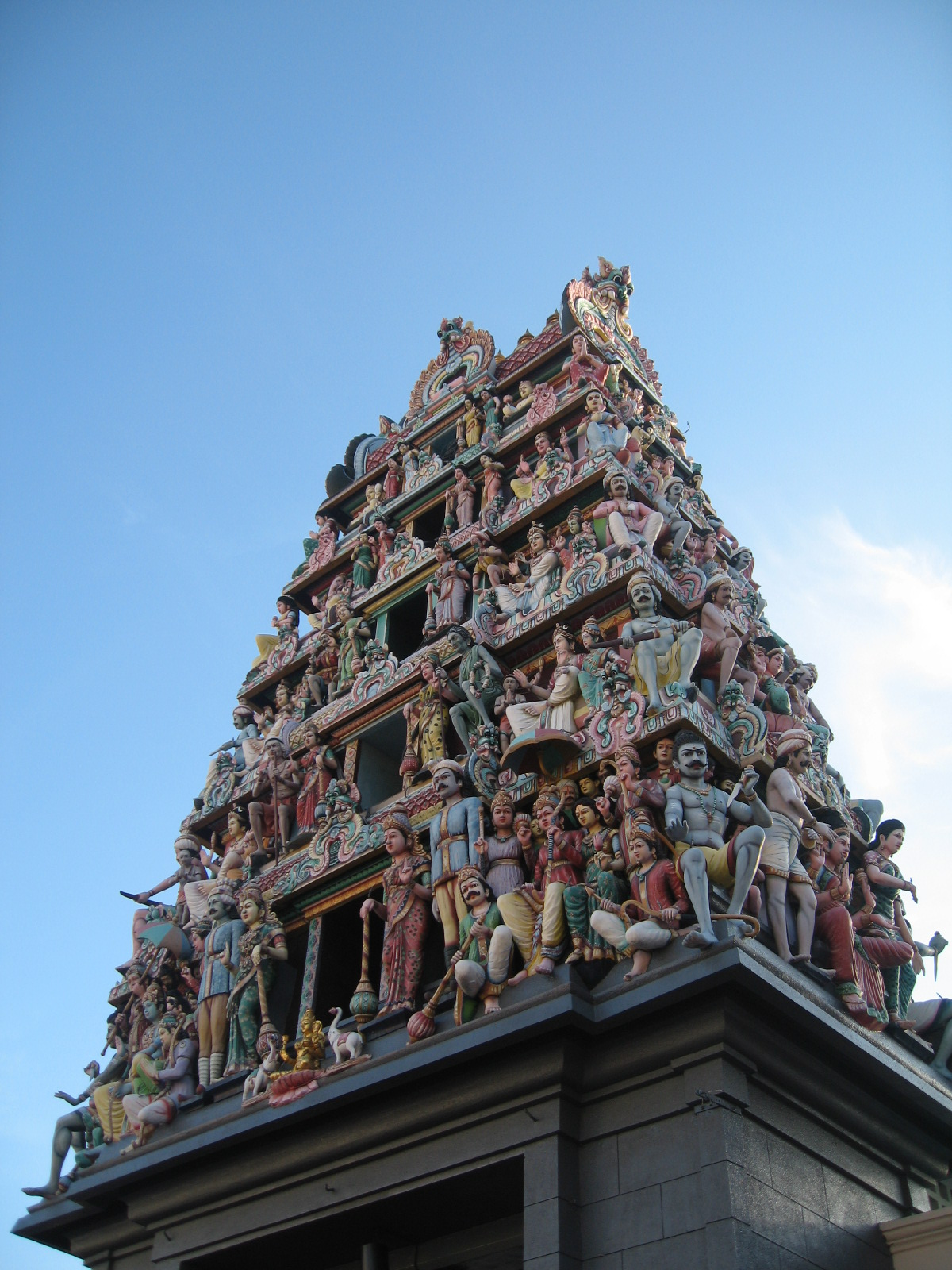
Sri Mariamman Temple, is Singapore's oldest Hindu temple located in Chinatown, Singapore

A former British colony, Singapore has various historical and cultural landmarks with British and regional influences in its architecture. Such cultural landmarks include the Masjid Sultan, one of Singapore's most important mosques which was completed in 1826. The Thian Hock Keng Temple, one of Singapore's oldest Chinese temples, which was completed in 1839 and the Sri Mariamman Temple, which was built in 1827, making it the oldest Hindu temple in Singapore. Other historical monuments include the Kranji War Memorial, Civilian War Memorial, Victoria Theatre and Concert Hall, Yueh Hai Ching Temple, Lian Shan Shuang Lin Monastery and Istana Kampong Glam.

Singapore has four major museums depicting the art and history of the country and of the region. The Asian Civilisations Museum specialises in the material history of China, Southeast Asia, South Asia and West Asia, from which the diverse ethnic groups of Singapore trace their ancestry, while the Peranakan Museum, the first of its kind in the world, explores Peranakan cultures in Singapore and other former Straits Settlements in Malacca and Penang, and other Peranakan communities in Southeast Asia. Singapore's National Museum of Singapore is the oldest museum in the country, with its history dating back to 1849, mainly showcases collections of nation-building and the history of Singapore from the 14th century in a story-telling approach, while the Singapore Art Museum is a contemporary art museum focusing on art practices in Singapore, Southeast Asia and Asia. Other smaller museums include Changi Museum, which showcases collection of paintings, photographs and personal effects donated by former POWs (Prisoners of War) during the Japanese Occupation of Singapore and the Mint Museum of Toys, which has a collection of 3,000 toys and childhood memorabilia from the mid-19th century to mid-20th Century.

== City sight-seeing ==
=== Sightseeing Bus fleet ===
Historically, their fleet was made up of second-hand step-entrance double deckers in 2001–2004 for the City Sightseeing/Singapore Ducktours operation in Singapore, but new open-top buses were used beginning January 2006. Electronic destination displays (which uses Mobitec MobiLED in larger font) were added in January 2006 to replace roller-blinds in stages. As of 2023, Big Bus Tours has Volvo B9TL/Optare Visionaire or MCV DD103, Dennis Trident 2/East Lancs Lolyne, DAF DB250LF/Plaxton President and Ayats Integral buses, where they will progressively be replaced by Volvo BZL/MCV EvoSeti double decker buses as part of the Singapore Green Plan 2030. City Sightseeing and Gray Line Tours uses Alexander Dennis Enviro400 buses.

=== Boat fleet ===
- 5 Condiesel LARC V (Originally from Singapore Armed Forces, withdrawn in 2000 and converted in 2002. Progressively withdrawn from June 2022 after introduction of electric LARC-EV).
- 2 Condiesel LARC-EV (Built in January 2022)

== Nature sight-seeing ==
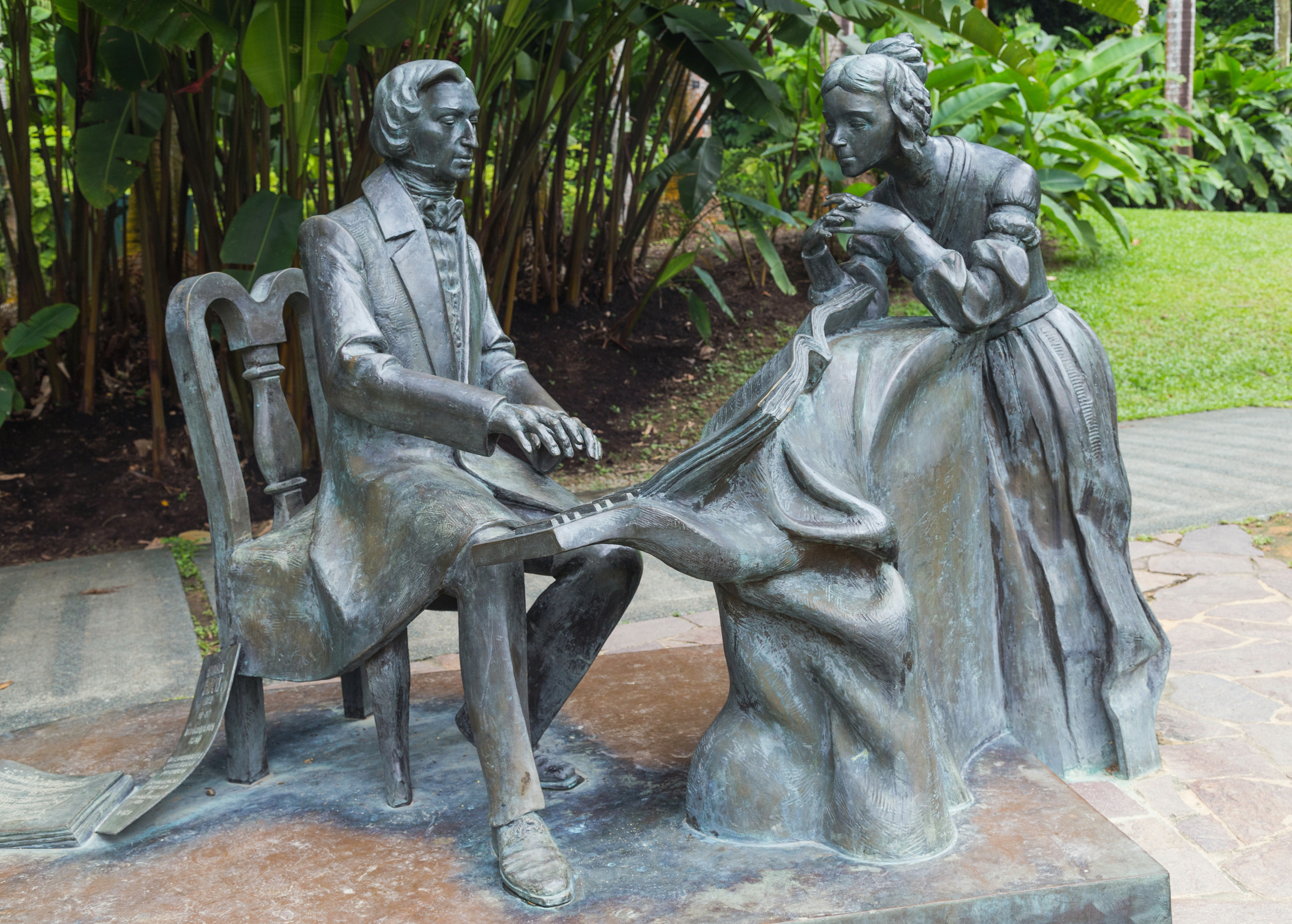
The monument to Chopin in the Singapore Botanic Gardens, just south of Symphony Lake.

Singapore has a variety of parks and projects which often feature its natural tropical environment.

Singapore has four zoos, namely, the Singapore Zoo, Night Safari, Bird Paradise and River Wonders. The Singapore Zoo displays animals in 'open' naturalistic, spacious, landscaped enclosures separated from the visitors by hidden barriers, moats, and glass, with various shows and events occurring throughout the day to allow visitors to interact with the animals. Night Safari is the world's first nocturnal zoo, set in a humid tropical forest that is only open at night, it is divided into seven geographical zones, which can be explored either on foot via four walking trails, or by tram. Bird Paradise is the largest bird park in Asia with extensive specimens of exotic bird life from around the world, including a flock of one thousand flamingos. River Wonders features a tropical rainforest setting and features 10 different ecosystems around the world, with 5000 animals of 300 species. Among the main attractions in the River Wonders is a pair of male and female giant pandas – Kai Kai (凯凯) and Jia Jia (嘉嘉) – which are housed in a specially constructed climate-controlled enclosure which change throughout the four seasons emulating their original environment.

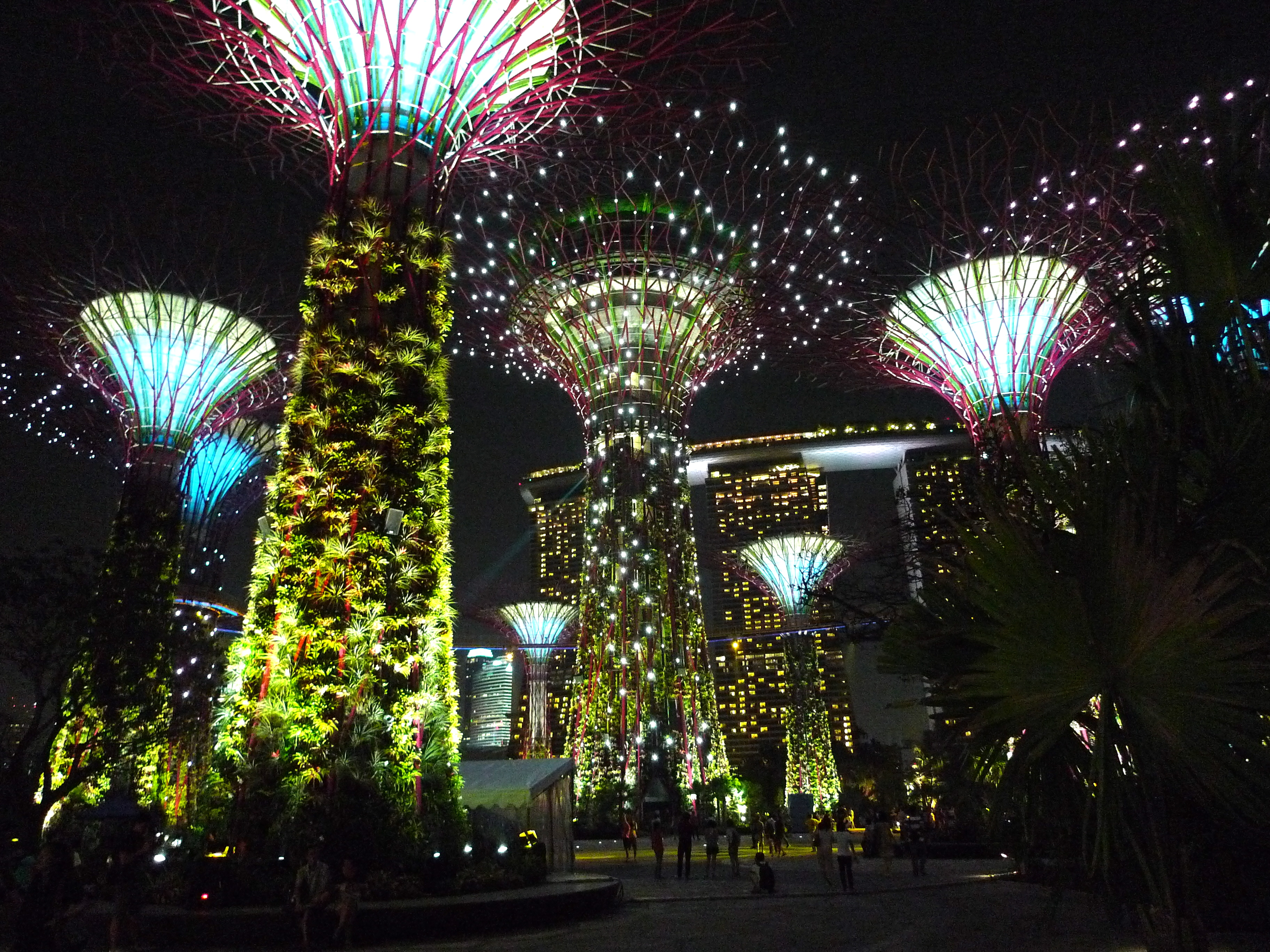
Supertrees at Gardens by the Bay, at night.

Among the various gardens and parks located in the country, Singapore's Singapore Botanic Gardens and Gardens by the Bay are most popular amongst tourists. The Singapore Botanical Gardens, a UNESCO World Heritage Site is a 52 hectares tropical garden, among its main attractions includes the National Orchid collection with over 3000 types of orchids growing. Gardens by the Bay, designed as a series of large tropical leaf-shaped gardens, each with its own specific landscaping design, character and theme. Its main attractions are the two conservatories, the Flower Dome, which replicates a mild, dry climate and features plants found in the Mediterranean and other semi-arid tropical regions, and the Cloud Forest, which replicates the cool moist conditions found in tropical mountain regions between 1,000 metres (3,300 ft) and 3,000 metres (9,800 ft) above sea level, found in South-East Asia, Middle- and South America. Other main attractions include the Supertree Grove, which features tree-like structures, known as Supertrees that dominate the Gardens' landscape. They are vertical gardens that perform a multitude of functions, which include planting, shading and working as environmental engines for the gardens.

Singapore also has two ASEAN Heritage Parks, which are the Bukit Timah Nature Reserve, an extensive nature reserve which covers much of the Bukit Timah Hill, and is the only remaining place where primary rainforest still exists on the island, and the Sungei Buloh Wetland Reserve, which is known for its high variety of bird species, crabs, mudskippers and flora and fauna.

Pulau Ubin, is an offshore island situated in the north-eastern island group, is one of the last rural areas to be found in Singapore, where the last of undeveloped kampongs (villages) and wooden jetties, abandoned quarries and plantations, with an abundance of natural flora and fauna. The island forms part of the Ubin–Khatib Important Bird Area (IBA), identified as such by BirdLife International because it supports significant numbers of visiting and resident birds, some of which are threatened. One of the more popular spots on the island is, Chek Jawa, a previous coral reef 5000 years ago, where several ecosystems can be observed in one area.

== Dining ==
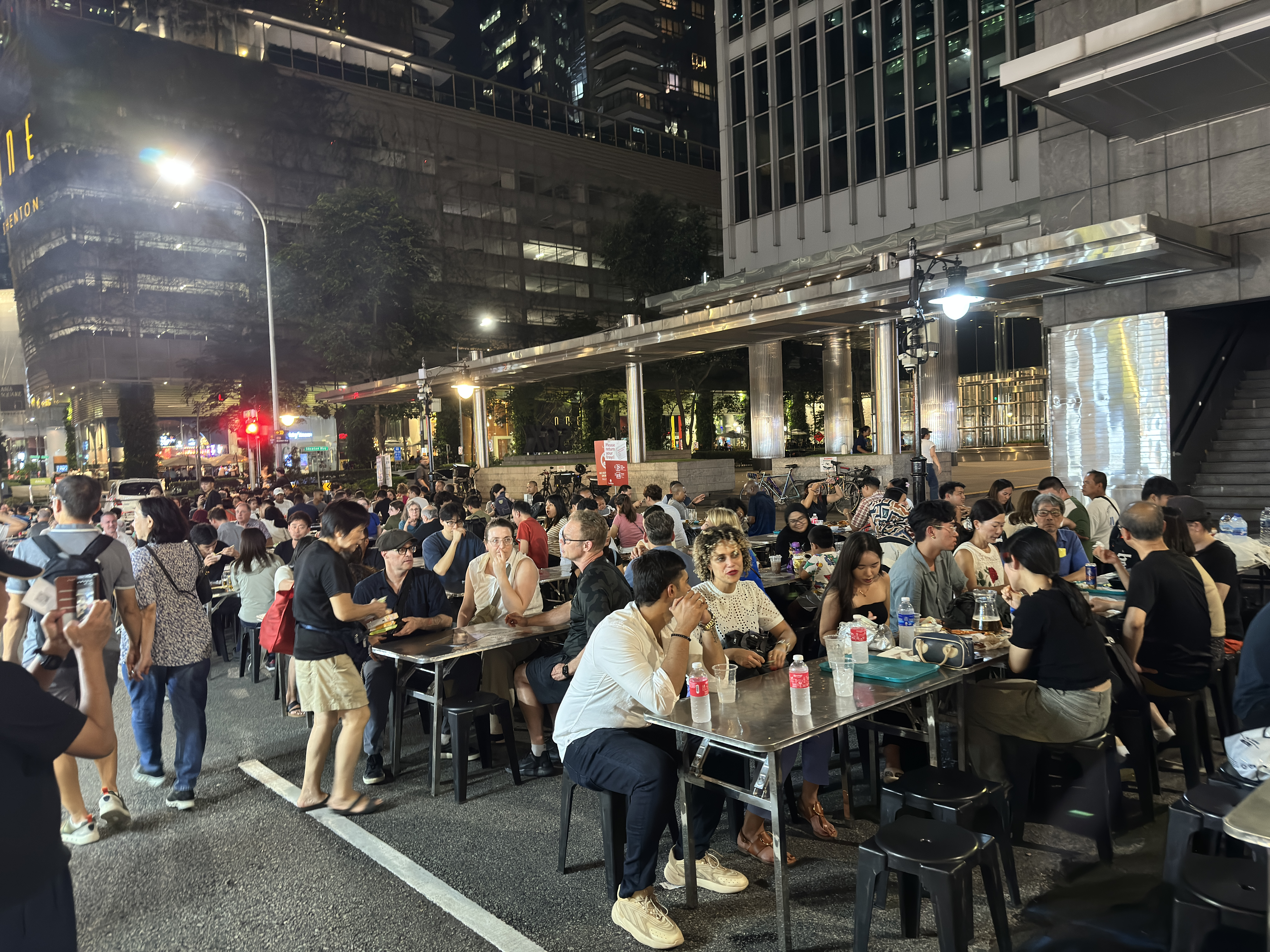
Lau Pa Sat's Satay Street occupies Boon Tat Street, which closes each evening to host open-air satay stalls.

Singapore's cuisine reflects its multicultural heritage, shaped by its role as a major international port since its establishment as a British trading post in 1819. A large part of Singaporean cuisine centres around the hawker culture in the country. Hawker stalls first began around mid 1800s and were largely made up of street food stalls selling a huge variety of foods. Influenced primarily by Chinese, Malay, and Indian culinary traditions—mirroring the country's ethnic composition—Singaporean food has evolved into a rich tapestry of flavors. This diversity is most evident in the nation's hawker culture, which dates back to the mid-1800s when street vendors began offering a wide variety of affordable dishes.

In hawker centres—an enduring cornerstone of daily life—cross-cultural influences abound. Malay stalls often serve halal versions of Chinese or Tamil dishes, while Chinese vendors incorporate Malay and Indian ingredients and techniques. Some dishes fuse elements from all three cultures, alongside influences from across Asia and the West.. This culinary blend was internationally recognized when Singapore's hawker culture was inscribed on UNESCO's Intangible Cultural Heritage list in 2020. With hawker centres and food courts more prevalent and accessible than restaurants, dining out is a common practice among Singaporeans, especially given the affordability and variety these centres offer. Notable among them are Lau Pa Sat, Newton Food Centre, and Maxwell Food Centre, where several stalls have earned Bib Gourmand recognition.

Food is also a key pillar of Singapore's tourism strategy, promoted alongside shopping as one of the nation's top attractions by the Singapore Tourism Board. The Singapore Food Festival, held every July, celebrates this culinary diversity. Thanks to its multicultural roots, international options, and a price range catering to all budgets, Singapore has earned its reputation as a global "food paradise." Iconic local dishes include kaya toast, chilli crab, fish head curry, laksa and roti prata, and Hainanese chicken rice—often regarded as Singapore's national dish.

== Tourist events ==
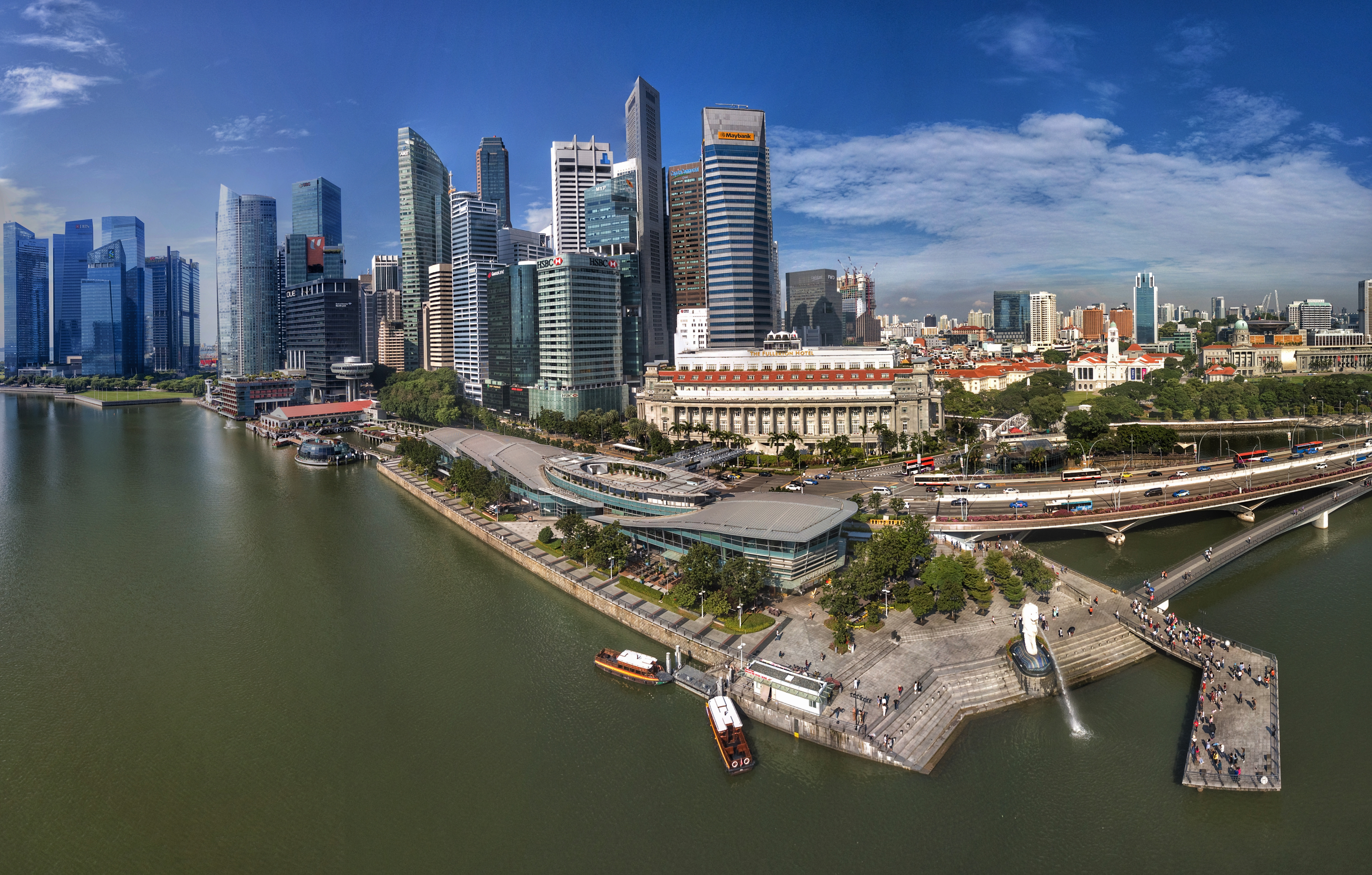
Aerial Panorama of Merlion Park and its surrounds

Singapore Tourism Board promotes a variety of events all year round for tourists. Some of the anchor events are the Chingay Parade, Singapore Arts Festival and Singapore Garden Festival. The Singapore Food Festival is held every July to celebrate Singapore's cuisine. Other annual events include the Singapore Sun Festival, the Christmas Light Up, and the Singapore Jewel Festival. Since 2008, Singapore has hosted the Singapore Grand Prix, part of the FIA Formula One World Championship. The inaugural race, held on a new street circuit at Marina Bay, was the first night-time event in Formula One history. The race was not held in 2020 or 2021 due to the COVID-19 pandemic. In 2010, Singapore hosted the inaugural Youth Olympic Games, where the Singapore Tourism Board (STB) said the Games is expected to generate a minimum of 180,000 visitor nights for Singapore.

== See also ==
- Visa policy of Singapore
- Communications in Singapore
- Culture of Singapore
- History of Singapore
- History of the Republic of Singapore
- Landmark sites in Singapore
- Media of Singapore
- Singapore Tourism Board
- Transport in Singapore
