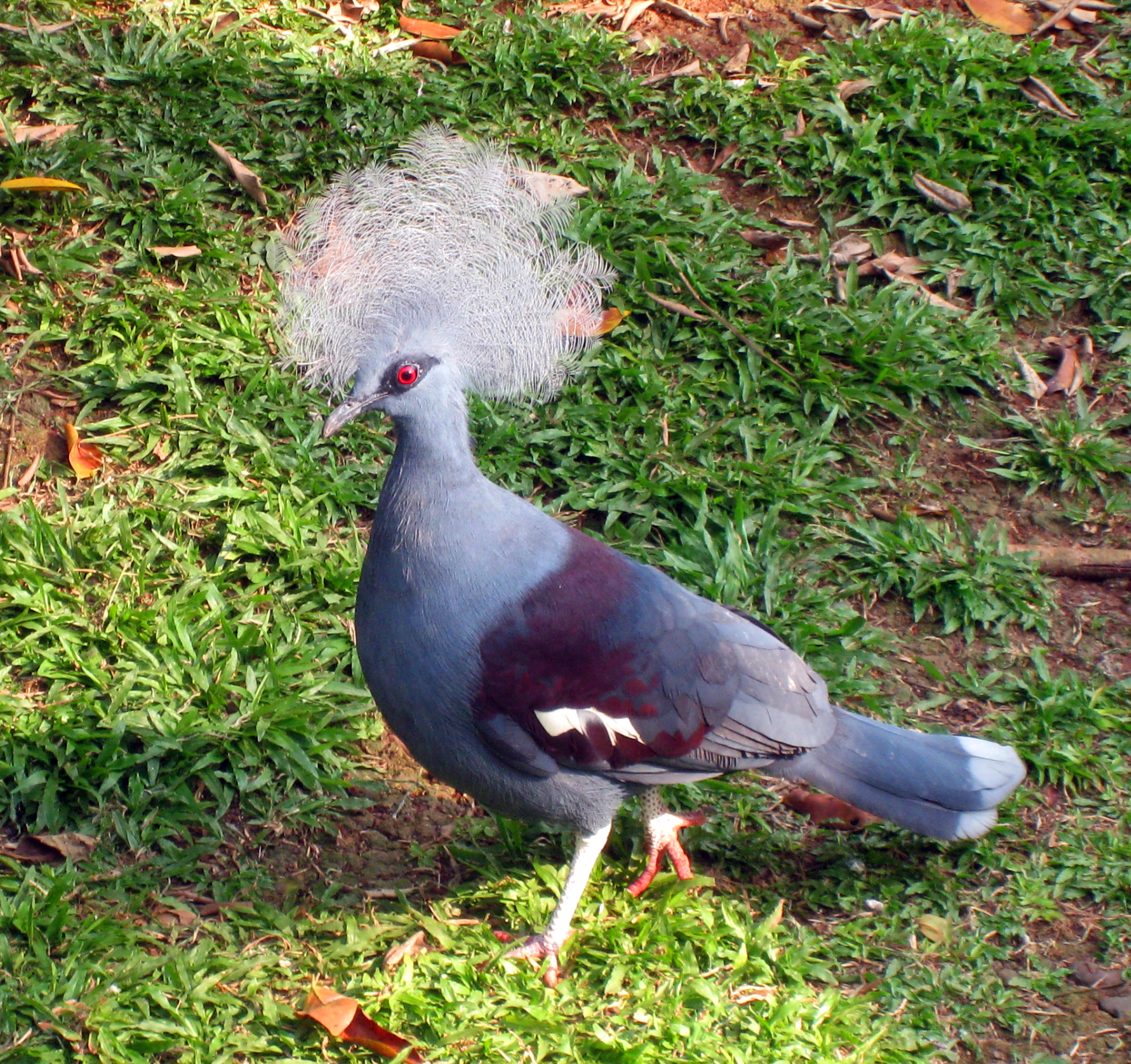
- At Taman Mini Indonesia Indah Birdpark, Jakarta, Indonesia

Conservation status
- Vulnerable (IUCN 3.1)
- CITES Appendix II

Scientific classification
- Kingdom: Animalia
- Phylum: Chordata
- Class: Aves
- Order: Columbiformes
- Family: Columbidae
- Genus: Goura
- Species: G. cristata

Binomial name
- Goura cristata (Pallas, 1764)

Synonyms
- Columba cristata Pallas, 1764; Columba coronata Linnaeus, 1766

= Western crowned pigeon =

Species of bird

The western crowned pigeon (Goura cristata), also known as the common crowned pigeon or blue crowned pigeon, is a large, blue-grey pigeon with blue lacy crests over the head and dark blue mask feathers around its eyes. Both sexes are almost similar but males are often larger than females. It is on average 70 cm (28 in) long and weighs 2.1 kg (4.6 lbs).

Along with its close and very similar-looking relatives the Victoria crowned pigeon, Sclater's crowned pigeon, and Scheepmaker's crowned pigeon, it is one of the largest members of the pigeon family. The western crowned pigeon is found in and is endemic to the lowland rainforests of northwestern New Guinea; the other species of crowned pigeon inhabit different regions of the island. The diet consists mainly of fruits and seeds.

Hunted for food and its plumes, it remains common only in remote areas. Due to ongoing habitat loss, limited range and overhunting in some areas, the western crowned pigeon is evaluated as Vulnerable on the IUCN Red List of Threatened Species. It is listed in Appendix II of CITES.

The western crowned pigeon was first described by the German naturalist Peter Simon Pallas in 1764 and given the binomial name Columba cristata. A molecular phylogenetic study published in 2018 found that the western crowned pigeon was most closely related to Sclater's crowned pigeon (Goura sclaterii).

== In culture ==
- The mambruk ubiaat (western crowned pigeon) appears on the coat of arms of Manokwari Regency located in West Papua, Indonesia.
- The western crowned pigeon was featured on the 1968 Indonesian postage stamps.
- The western crowned pigeon appears on coat of arms of a proposed Republic of West Papua.
- The video game spin-off Angry Birds Stella has a western crowned pigeon named Willow, who wears a striped hat to conceal her crest.

== Gallery ==
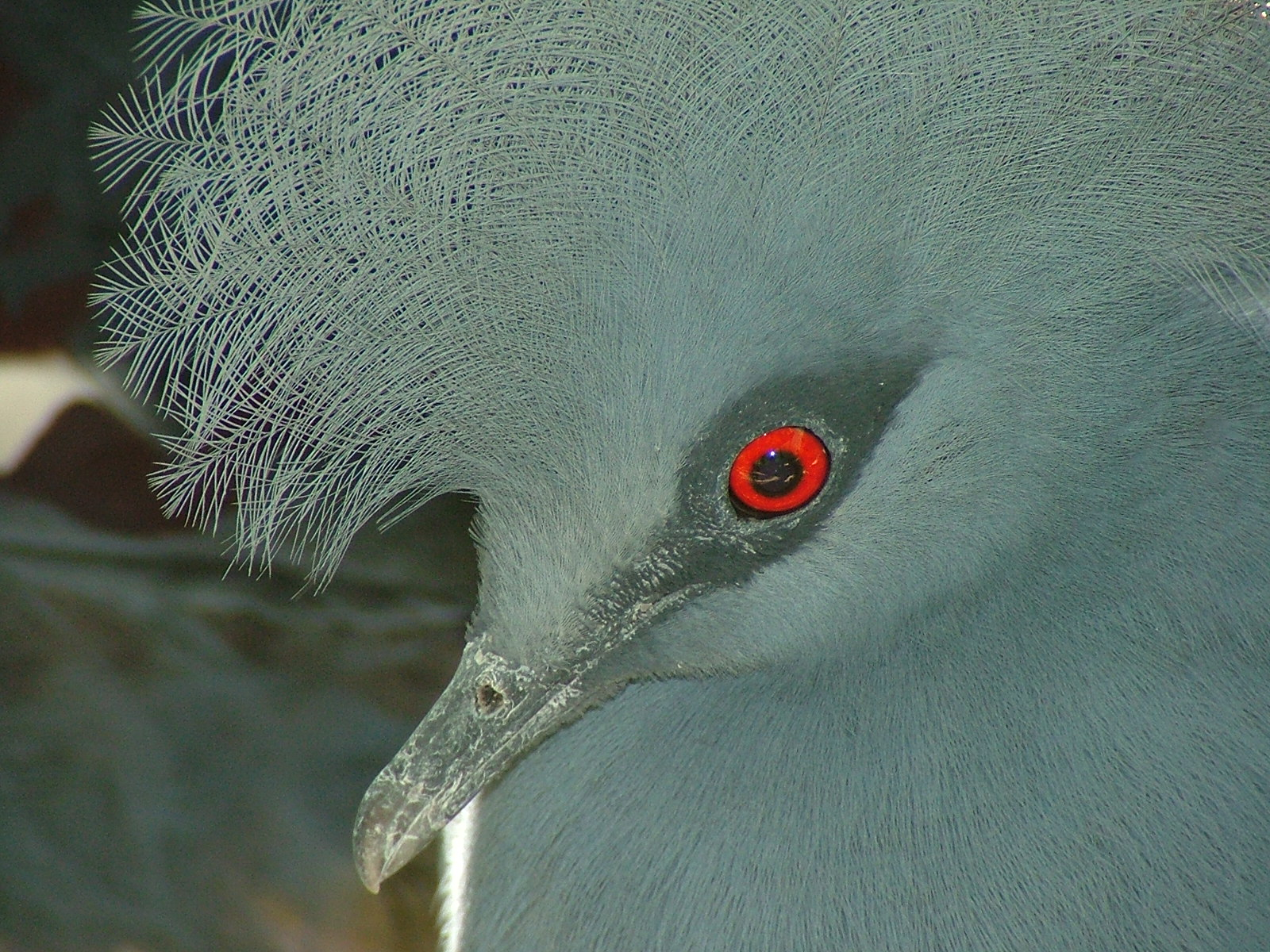

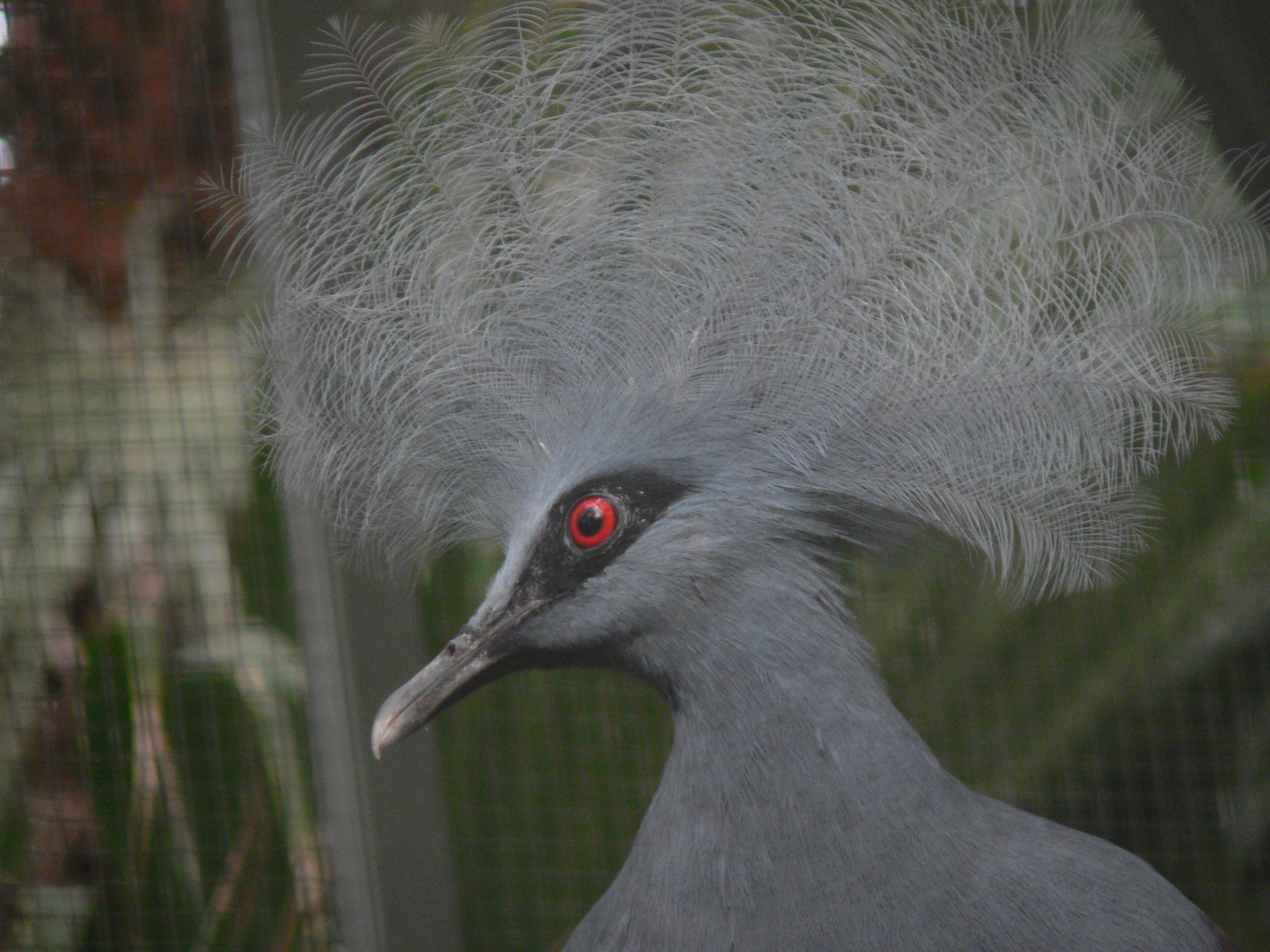

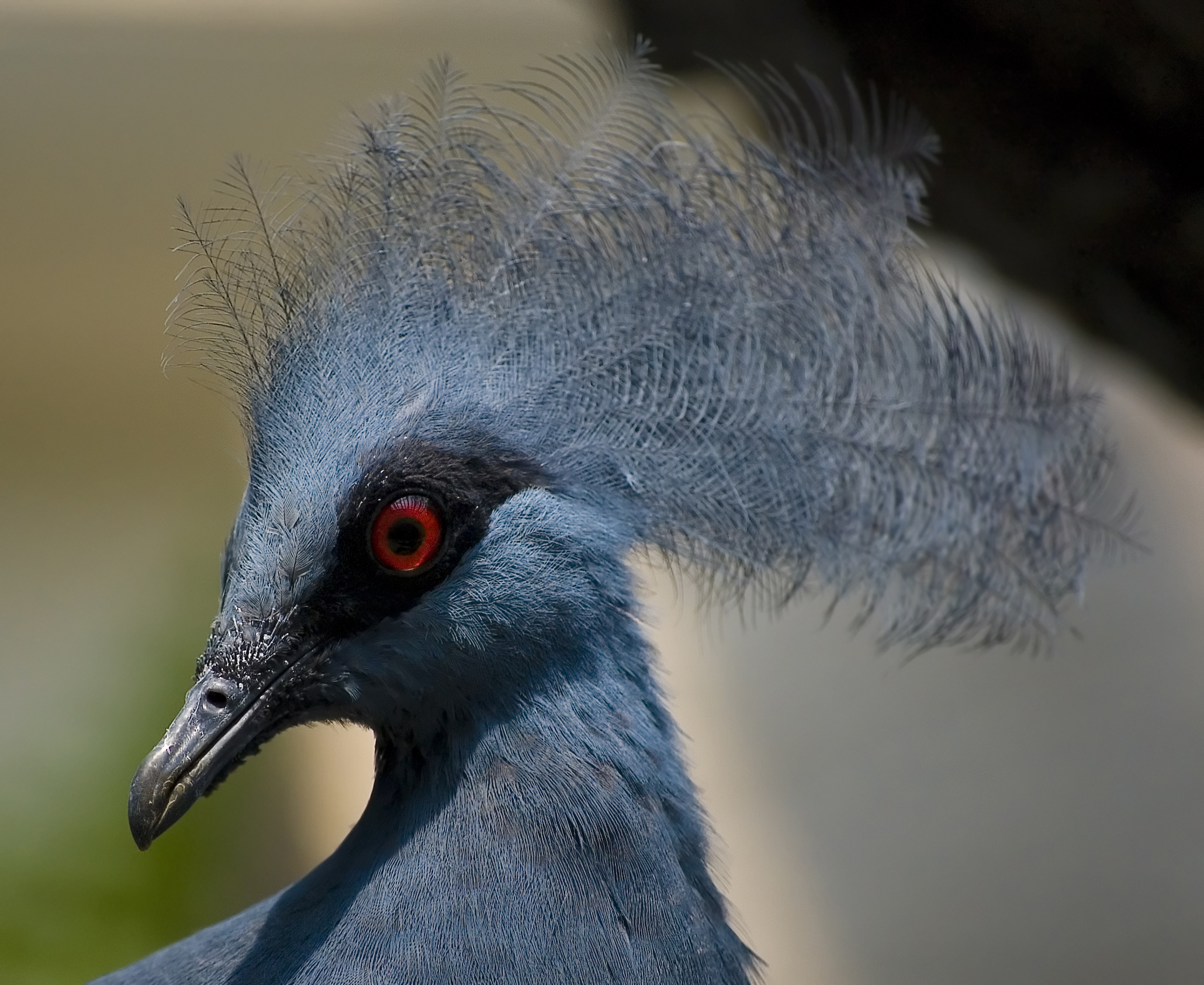

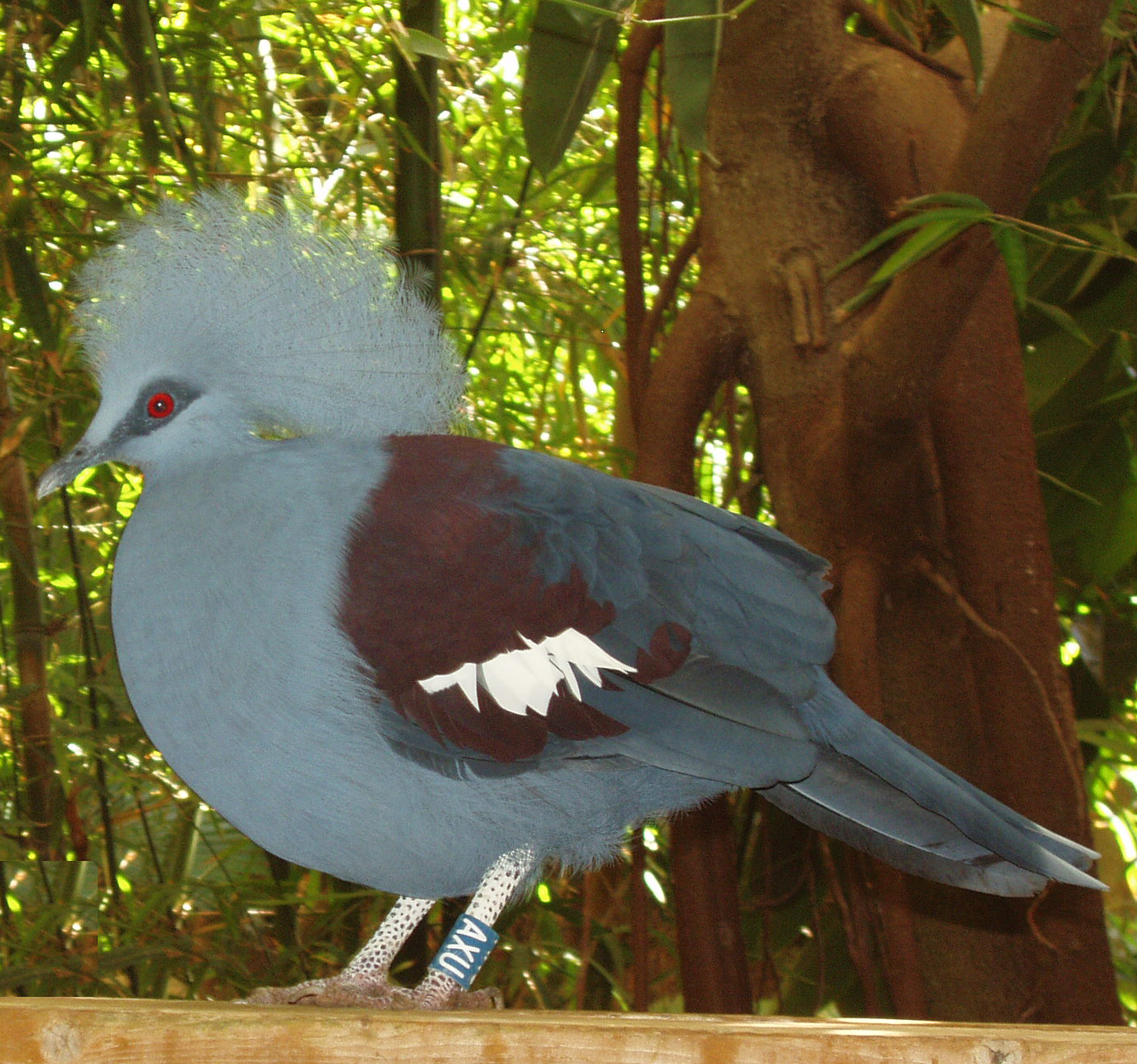

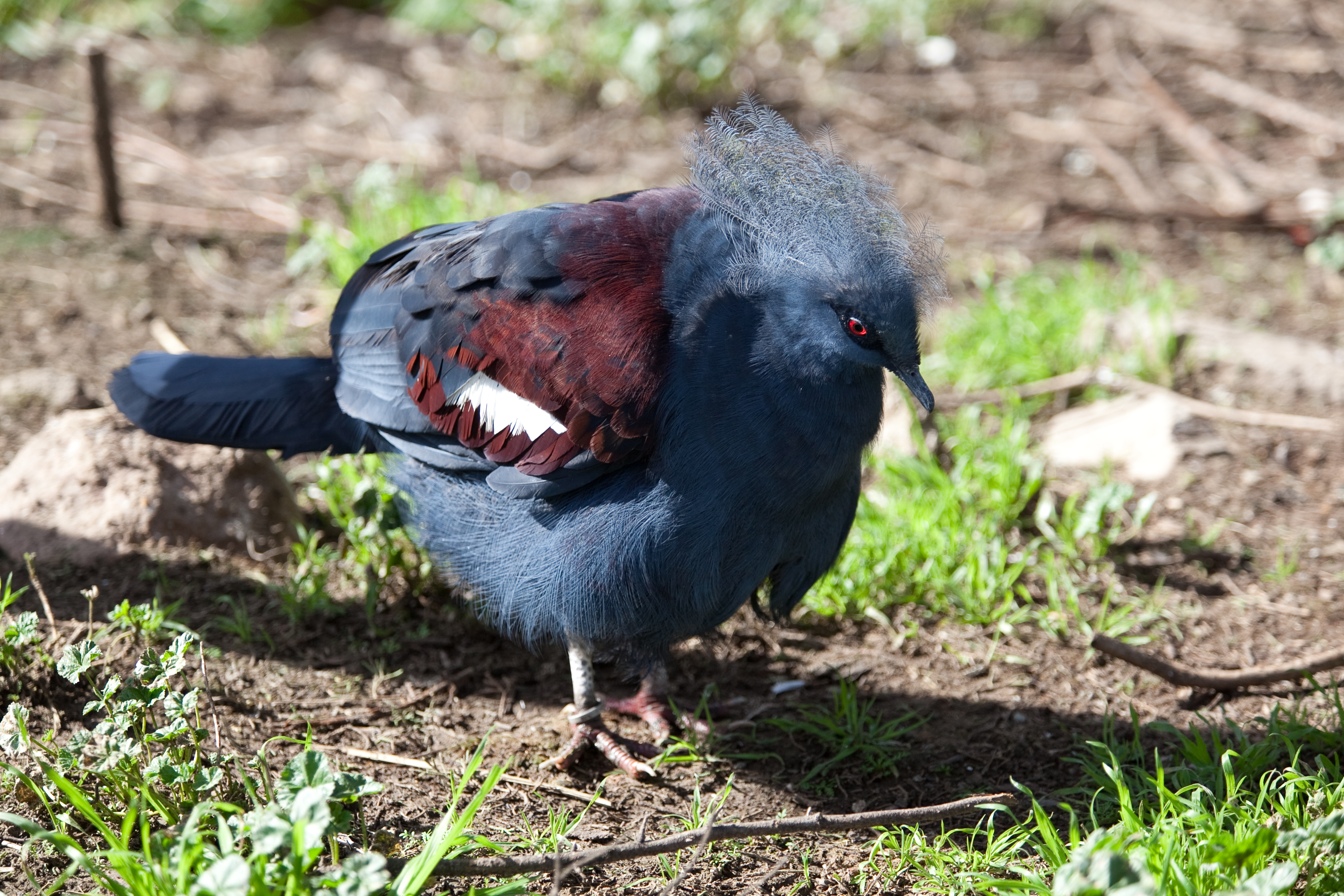

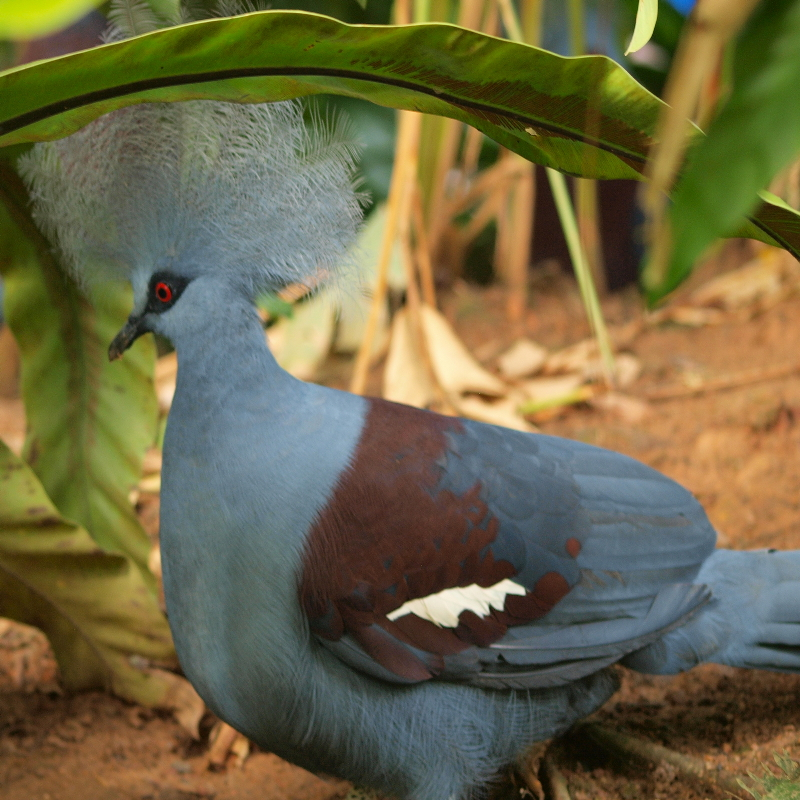

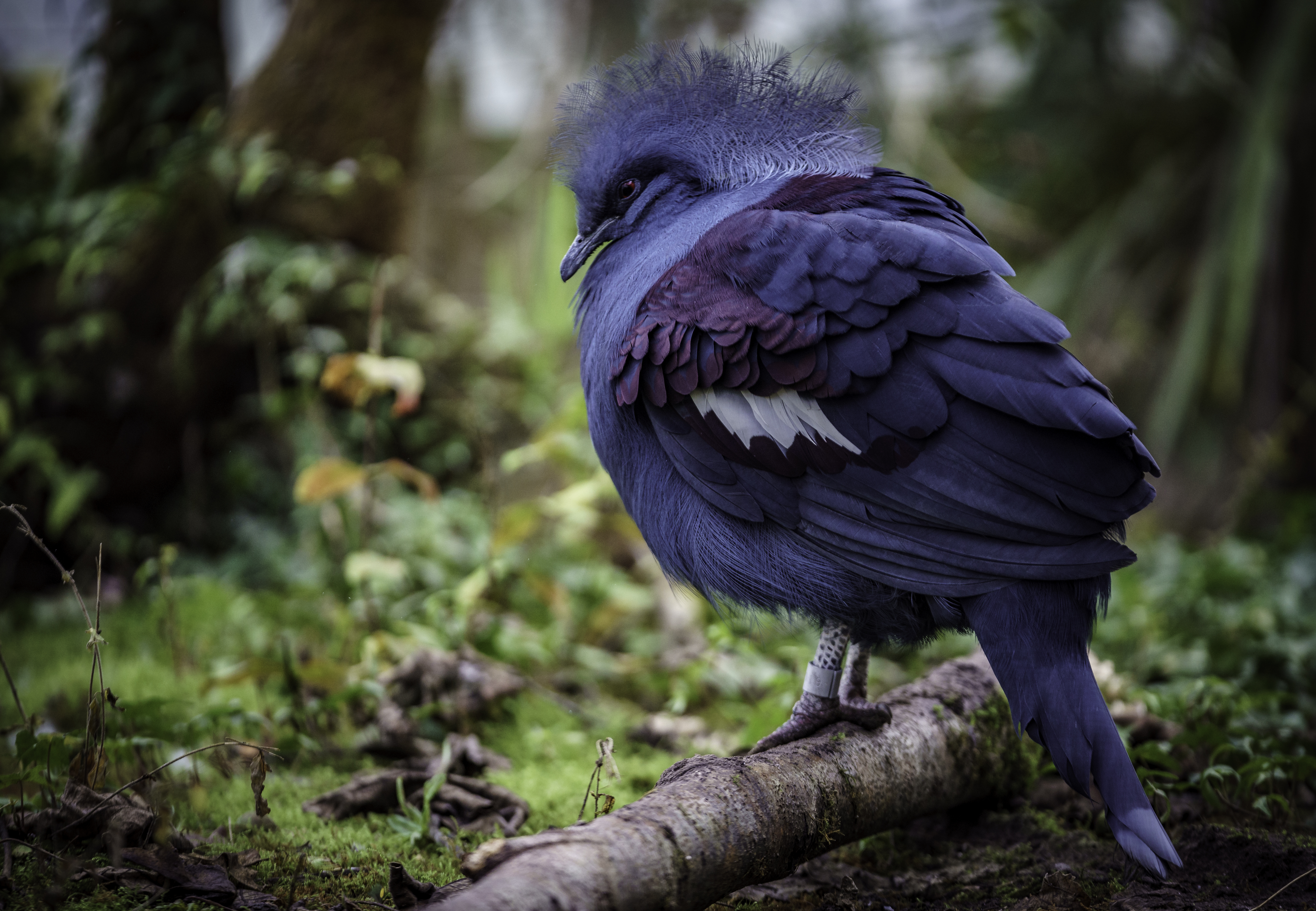

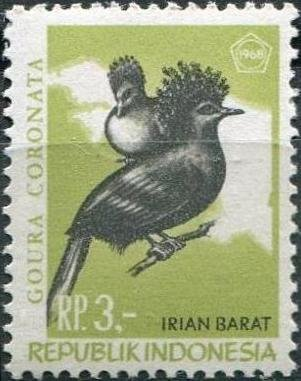
