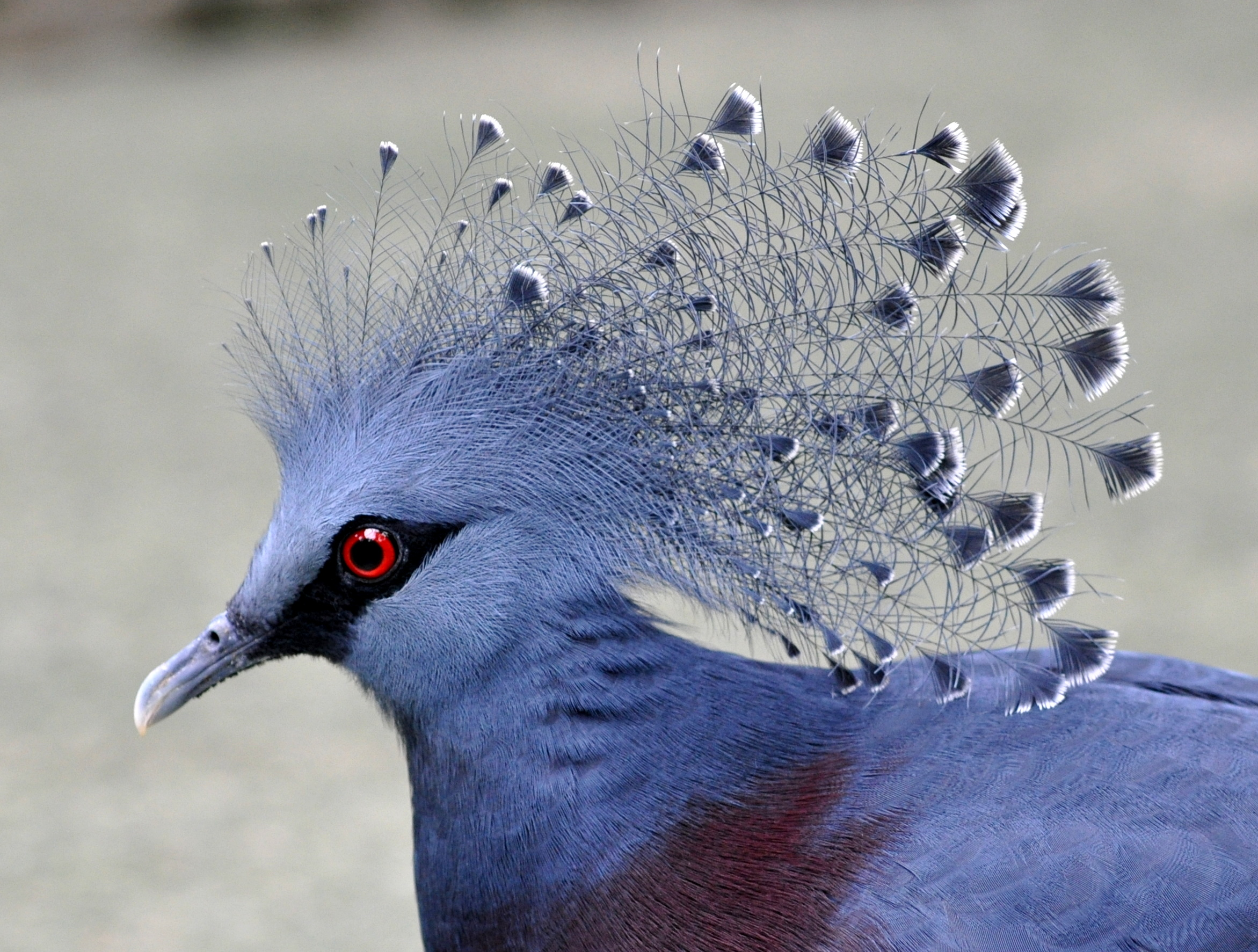
- Victoria crowned pigeon

Conservation status
- CITES Appendix II

Scientific classification
- Kingdom: Animalia
- Phylum: Chordata
- Class: Aves
- Order: Columbiformes
- Family: Columbidae
- Tribe: Raphini
- Genus: Goura; Stephens, 1819

Type species
- Columba cristata Pallas, 1764

= Crowned pigeon =

Genus of birds

The crowned pigeons (Goura) are a genus of birds in the family Columbidae. It contains four large species of pigeon that are endemic to the island of New Guinea and a few surrounding islands. The species are extremely similar to each other in appearance, and occupy different regions of New Guinea. The genus was introduced by the English naturalist James Francis Stephens in 1819.

They forage on the forest floor eating fallen fruit, seeds and snails. The males and females are almost identical, but during courtship the male will coo and bow for the female. Both parents incubate one egg for 28 to 30 days and the chick takes another 30 days to fledge. The life span can be over 20 years.

== Systematics and evolution ==
The genus Goura was introduced by the English naturalist James Francis Stephens in 1819. The type species is the western crowned pigeon. The word Goura comes from the New Guinea aboriginal name for crowned pigeons.

The genus contains four species:

Image	Scientific name	Common name	Distribution
	Goura cristata	Western crowned pigeon	northwestern New Guinea
	Goura scheepmakeri	Scheepmaker's crowned pigeon	southeastern New Guinea
	Goura sclaterii	Sclater's crowned pigeon	southern New Guinea
	Goura victoria	Victoria crowned pigeon	northern New Guinea

Scheepmaker's crowned pigeon and Sclater's crowned pigeon were previously considered as conspecific with the English name "southern crowned-pigeon".

A molecular phylogenetic study published in 2018 found that the four species in the genus formed two pairs: the western crowned pigeon was sister to Sclater's crowned pigeon while Scheepmaker's crowned pigeon was sister to the Victoria crowned pigeon.

Goura phylogeny

- - Tooth-billed pigeon
  - - Nicobar pigeon
    - - Dodo
      - Rodrigues solitaire
  - - - Scheepmaker's crowned pigeon
      - Victoria crowned pigeon
    - - Sclater's crowned pigeon
      - Western crowned pigeon

Cladogram showing the crowned pigeons and their closest relatives based on a study by Bruxaux and colleagues published in 2018.
