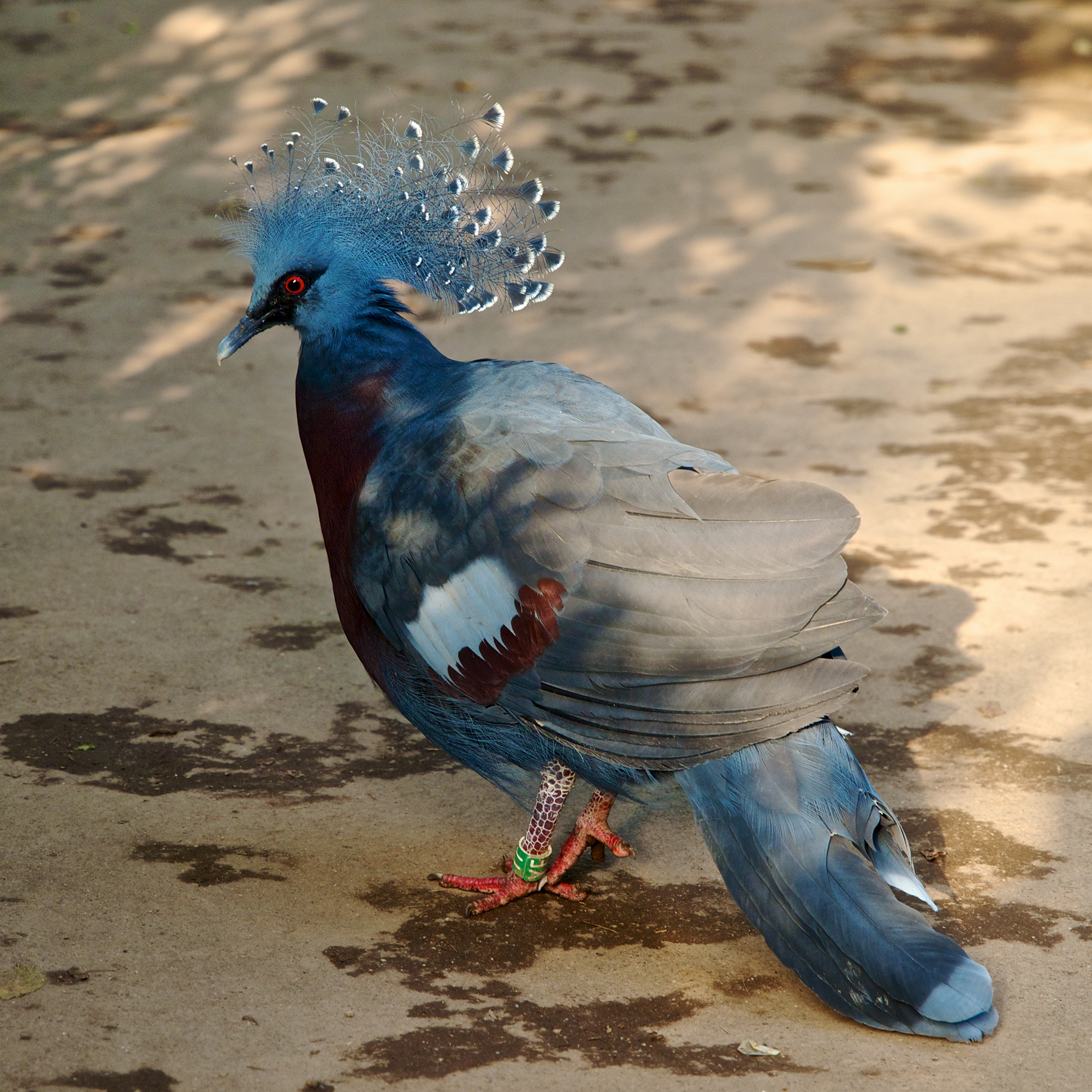
- At Leipzig Zoological Garden, Leipzig, Germany

Conservation status
- Near Threatened (IUCN 3.1)
- CITES Appendix II

Scientific classification
- Kingdom: Animalia
- Phylum: Chordata
- Class: Aves
- Order: Columbiformes
- Family: Columbidae
- Genus: Goura
- Species: G. victoria

Binomial name
- Goura victoria (Fraser, 1844)

= Victoria crowned pigeon =

Species of bird

The Victoria crowned pigeon (Goura victoria) is a large, bluish-grey pigeon with elegant blue lace-like crests, maroon breast and red irises. It is part of a genus (Goura) of four unique, very large, ground-dwelling pigeons native to the New Guinea region, with the Victoria crowned pigeon measuring as the largest extant species of pigeon. The bird may be easily recognized by the unique white tips on its crests and by its deep 'whooping' sounds made while calling. Its name commemorates the British monarch, Queen Victoria.

== Description ==
The Victoria crowned pigeon is a deep blue-grey colour with a small, black mask. Its feather crest (the signature feature of crowned pigeons other than their size) is conspicuously white-tipped. On the wing coverts is a row of feathers that are a paler blue-gray with maroon tips. These form a distinct wing bar. The chest is a deep purple-maroon color. As in all crowned pigeons, melanism has been observed. The other two crowned pigeons are somewhat superficially similar, but only the western crowned pigeon overlaps in range with the Victoria species. The Scheepmaker's crowned pigeon does not. In the western species, the crown is more scraggly and hair-like, the chest is a uniform blue-gray and not maroon, and a less distinct wing-bar is present. Both sexes are similar.

This species is typically 73 to 75 cm (29 to 30 in) long. Some specimens may exceed a length of 80 cm (31 in) and a weight of 3.5 kg (7.7 lb). It is marginally larger than the two other crowned pigeons on average, at a mean of 2.39 kg (5.3 lb) in adult body mass, thus is considered the largest surviving species of pigeon on Earth. The standard measurements among pigeons on mainland New Guinea are: the wing chord is 36–39 cm (14–15 in), the tail is 27–30.1 cm (10.6–11.9 in), the bill is 3.2–3.5 cm (1.3–1.4 in) and the unfeathered tarsus is 8.5–9.8 cm (3.3–3.9 in).

Two Victoria crowned pigeons in the National Aviary, Pittsburgh, United States.

Like other crowned pigeons, this species makes a loud clapping sound when it takes flight. The mating calls of this species are also similar to the other two species of crowned pigeons, consisting of a deep hoota-hoota-hoota-hoota-hoota sound. When defending their territories, these birds make a resounding whup-up, whup-up, whup-up call. Their contact call is a deep, muffled, and rather human-like ummm or hmmm.

The two subspecies of the Victoria crowned pigeon are G. v. beccarii found on the mainland of New Guinea and G. v. victoria, the nominate race, found on the islands of Yapen, Biak and Supiori. The nominate subspecies is markedly smaller, with a wing chord measurement of 31.6–33.2 cm (12.4–13.1 in), with less robust legs and feet and darker overall plumage. The nominate has a sparser crest with black on the wing coverts and right above the tail.

== Habitat ==
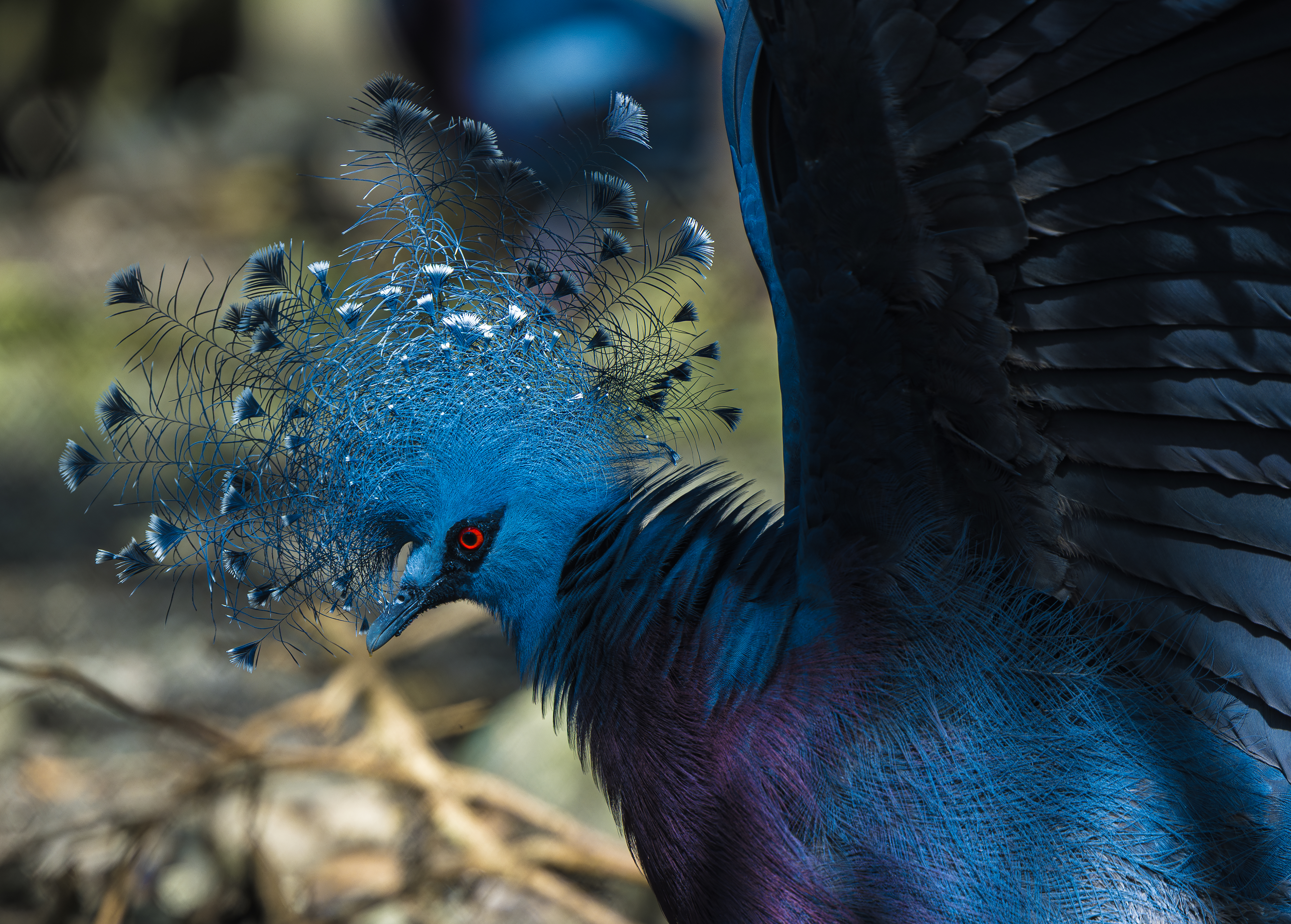
A male Victoria crowned pigeon displaying its wings in its natural habitat in Teluk Cenderawasih National Park.

The Victoria crowned pigeon is distributed in the lowland and swamp forests of northern New Guinea and surrounding islands. It usually occurs on areas that were former alluvial plains, including sago forests. Though typically found at or near sea level, occasionally birds of this species may venture up in the hills to an elevation up to about 3,000 feet.

== Behavior ==
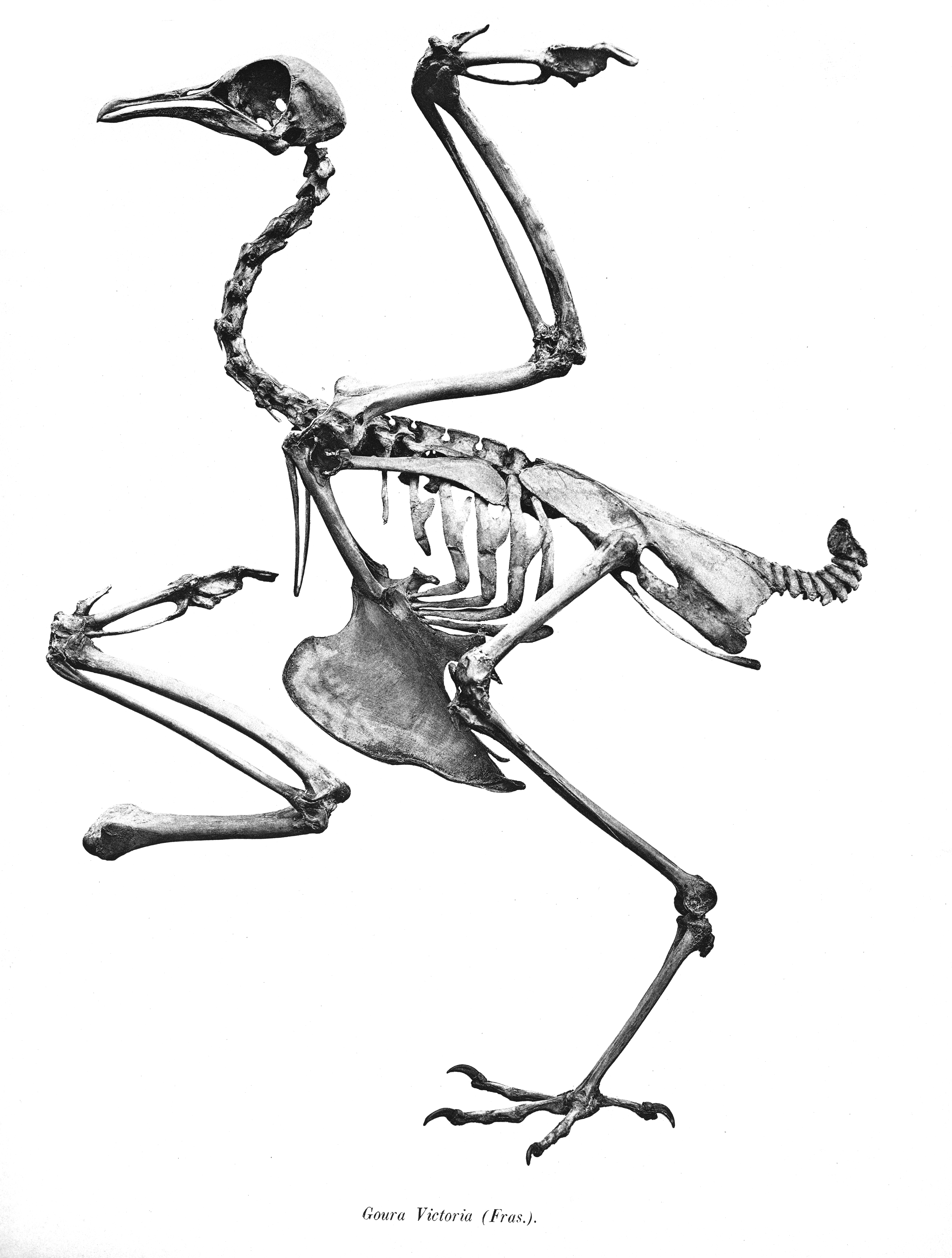
Skeleton

Like other crowned pigeons, the Victoria crowned pigeon is a gregarious species. They usually travel in pairs or small parties as they search for food. They walk with an unhurried gait along the forest floor. Their food typically consists of fallen fruit. Birds of this species in captivity are particularly fond of eating figs. Seeds and invertebrates may occasionally supplement the diet. When disturbed, these birds fly straight up into the canopy or a large horizontal branch of a large forest tree. After being disturbed, they may remain on their perch for a considerable time engaging in contact calls and flicking their tails. In the wild, this species tends to be shier than the western crowned pigeon, but can still occasionally be quietly approached. The males regularly engage in aggressive displays to establish dominance. In these interactions, the pigeons puff up their chests and repeatedly raise their wings as if preparing to strike their opponent. They also make short dashes at each other and may actually hit one another, but rarely make contact and can be completely peaceful towards other males outside of the early mating season.

== Reproduction ==
Breeding peaks late in the wet season and in the dry season. When the male displays for the female, he lowers his head down, stretches forward, and then rhythmically swings his head up and down while simultaneously wagging his fanned tail. Although the female does most direct brooding, both parents help raise the young. The female usually lays a single white egg in a well-built tree nest of stems, sticks, and palm leaves. In the weeks before she lays the egg, the male brings nesting material to the female. The egg is incubated around 30 days. The young leave the nest when they are still much smaller than their parents but are actively tended to for a total of 13 weeks.

== Status ==
The Victoria crowned pigeon is now the most rarely occurring of the three crowned pigeon species in the wild, although it is the most widely kept species in captivity. Perhaps the most pressing threat to the species is continuing habitat loss due to logging. It is now quite uncommon near human habitations because it is heavily hunted around them, particularly in areas where gun possession is prevalent. It can be quite tame and easily shot, though it now seems to be fearful of humans in the wild. Most hunting is for its plumes and meat. Trapping of pigeons to be kept alive for captive collections is now illegal but is still likely to be occurring. The Victoria crowned pigeon is evaluated as Near Threatened on the IUCN Red List of Threatened Species. It is listed in Appendix II of CITES.

== Gallery ==
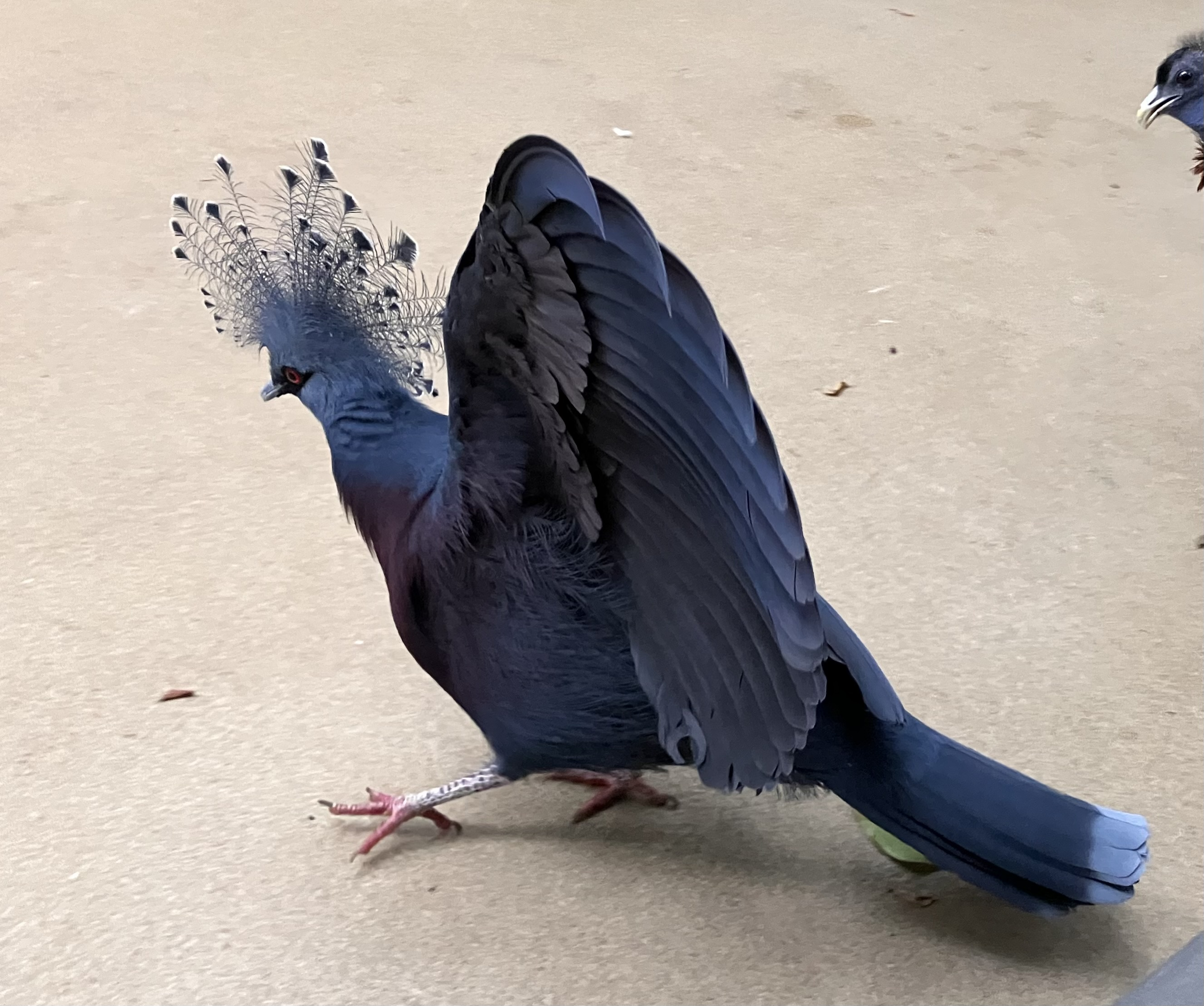

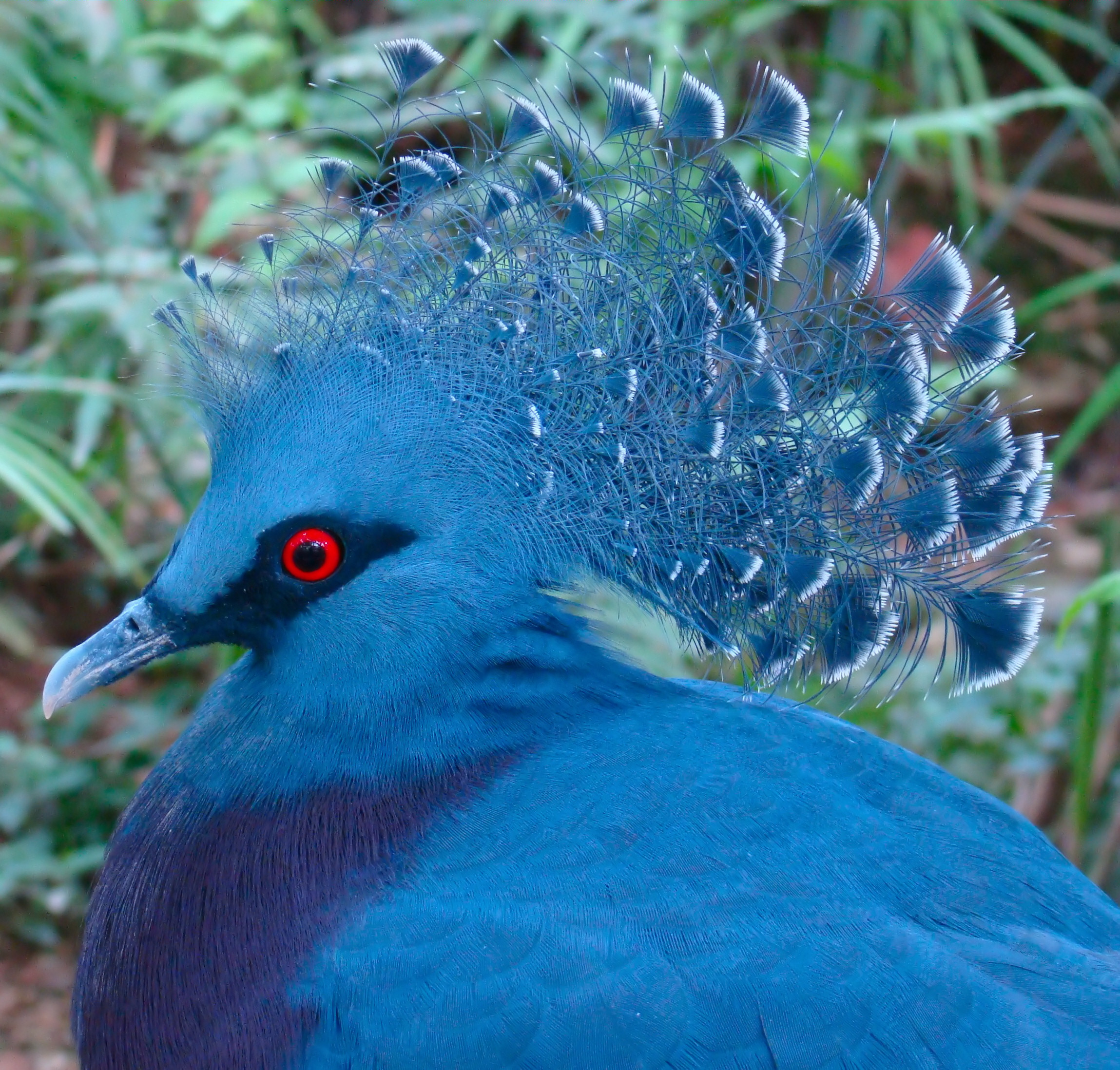

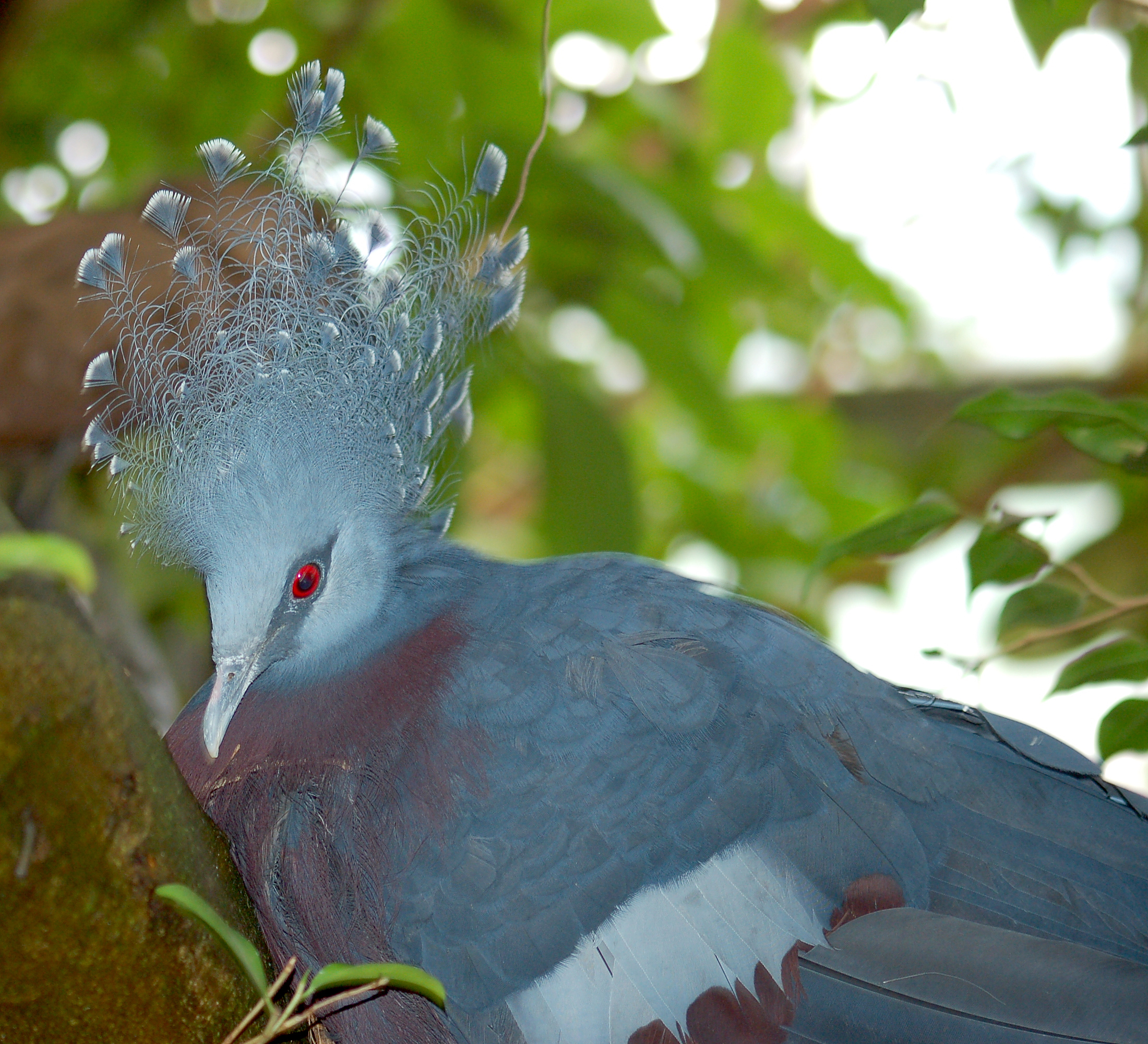

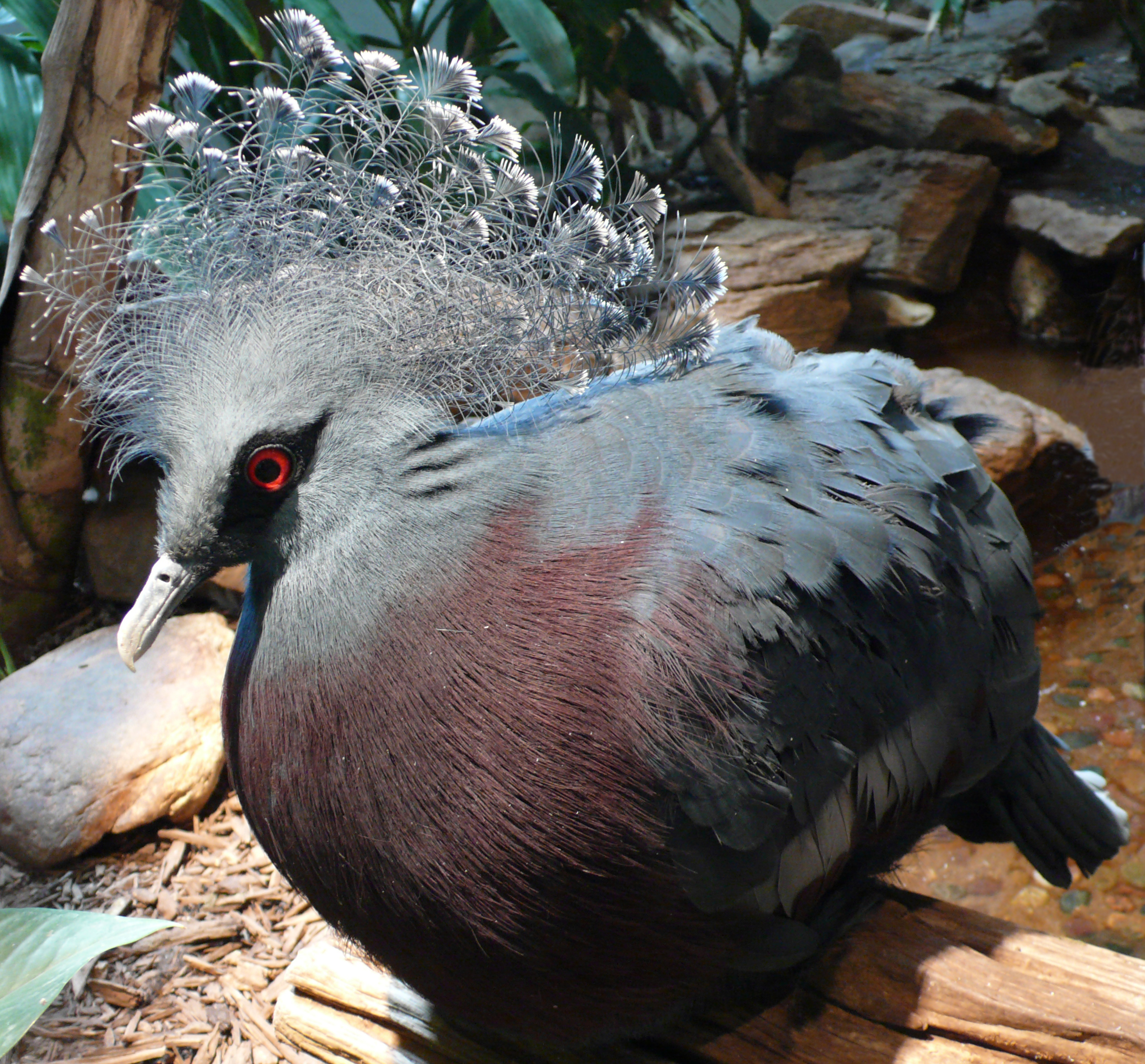

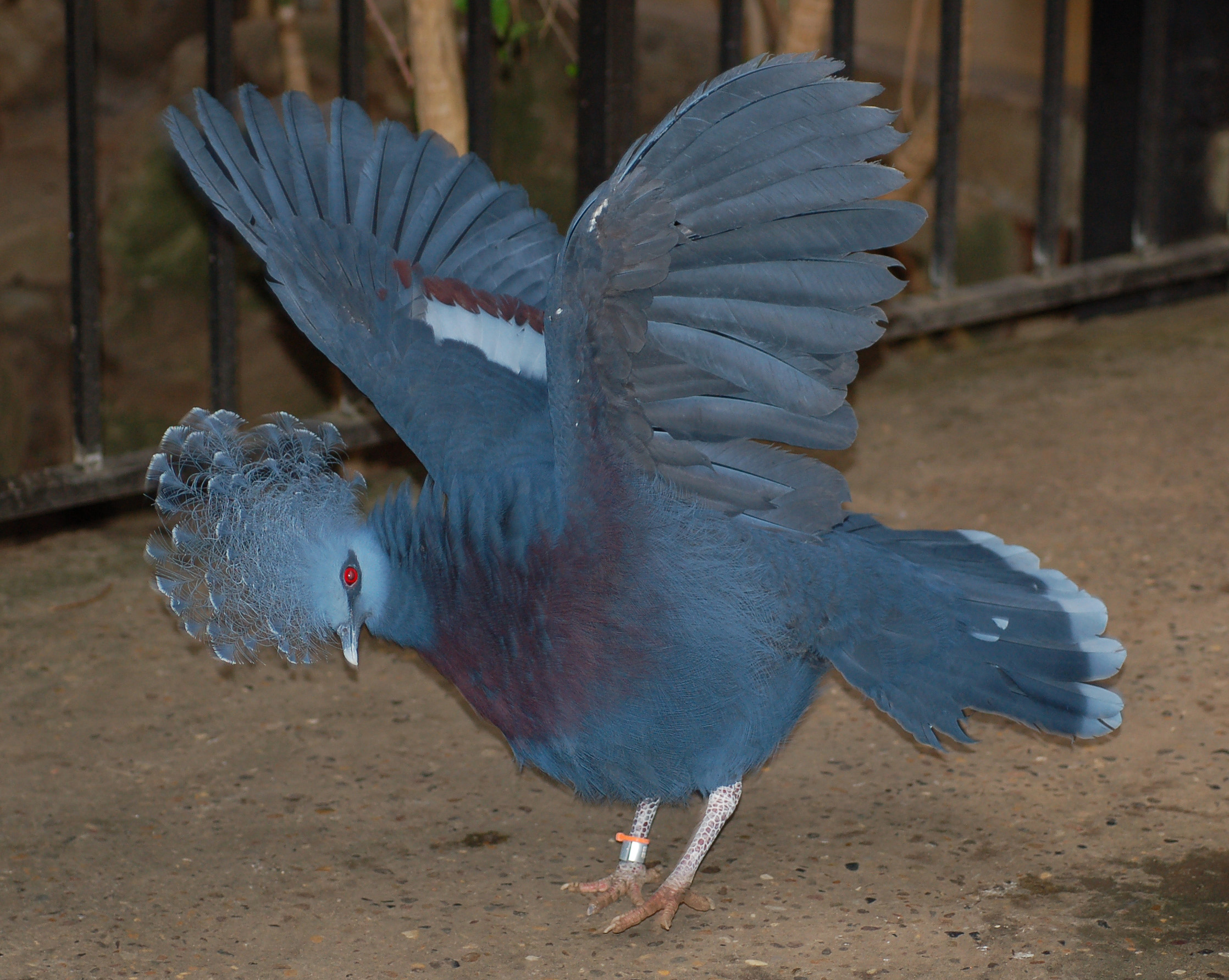

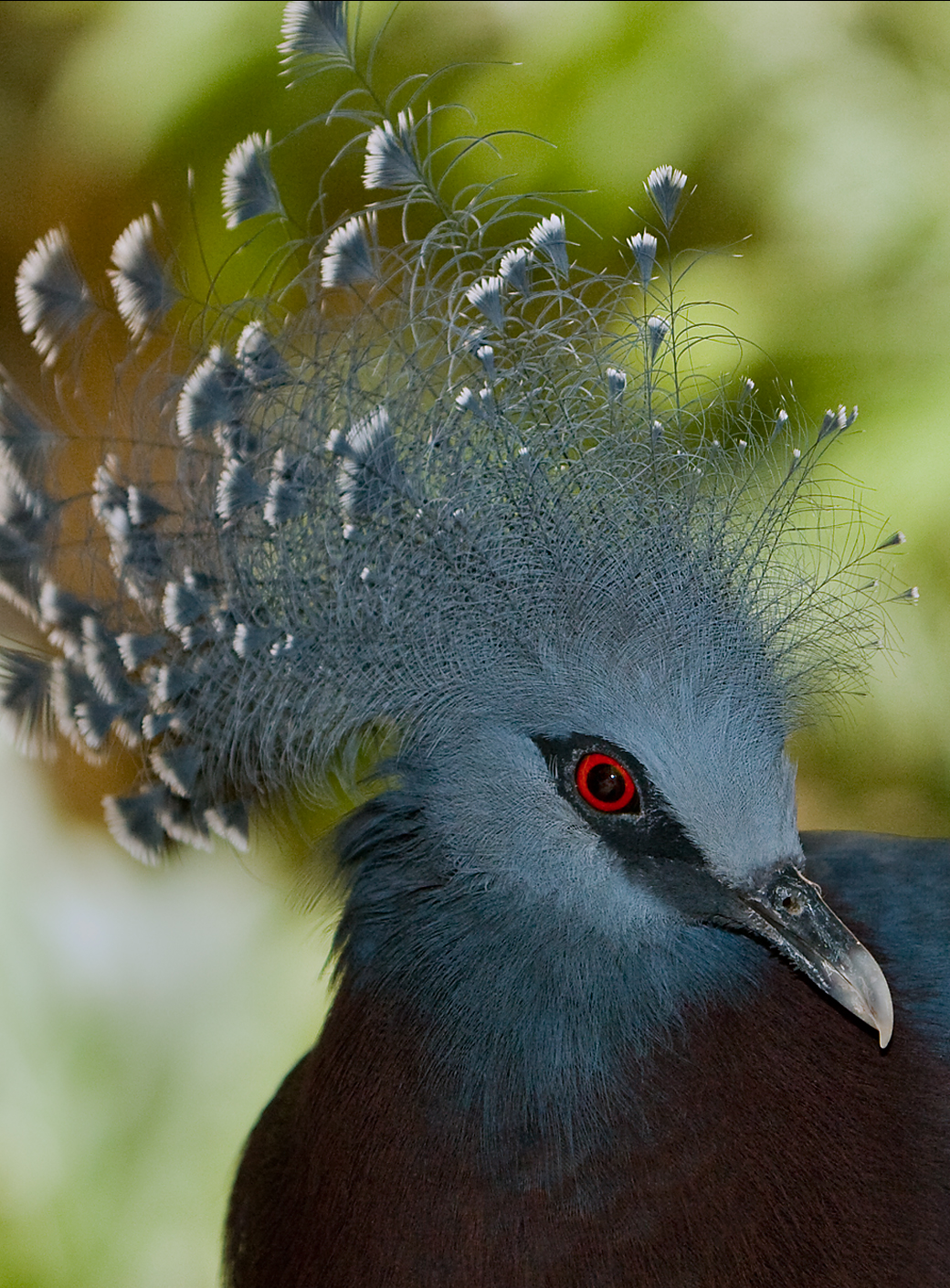

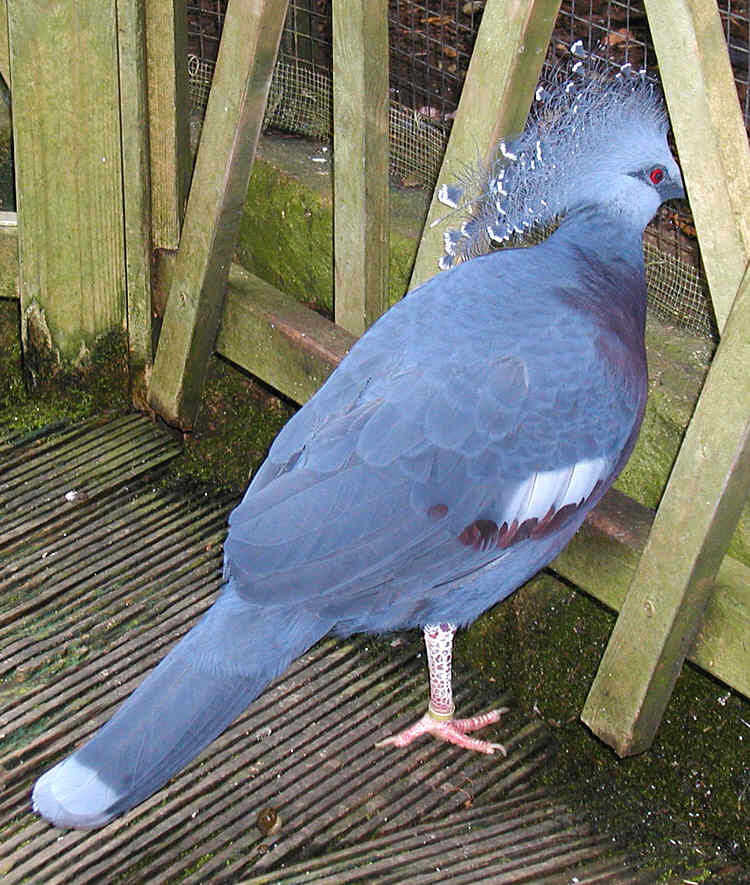
Victoria crowned pigeon at Bristol Zoo, Bristol, England

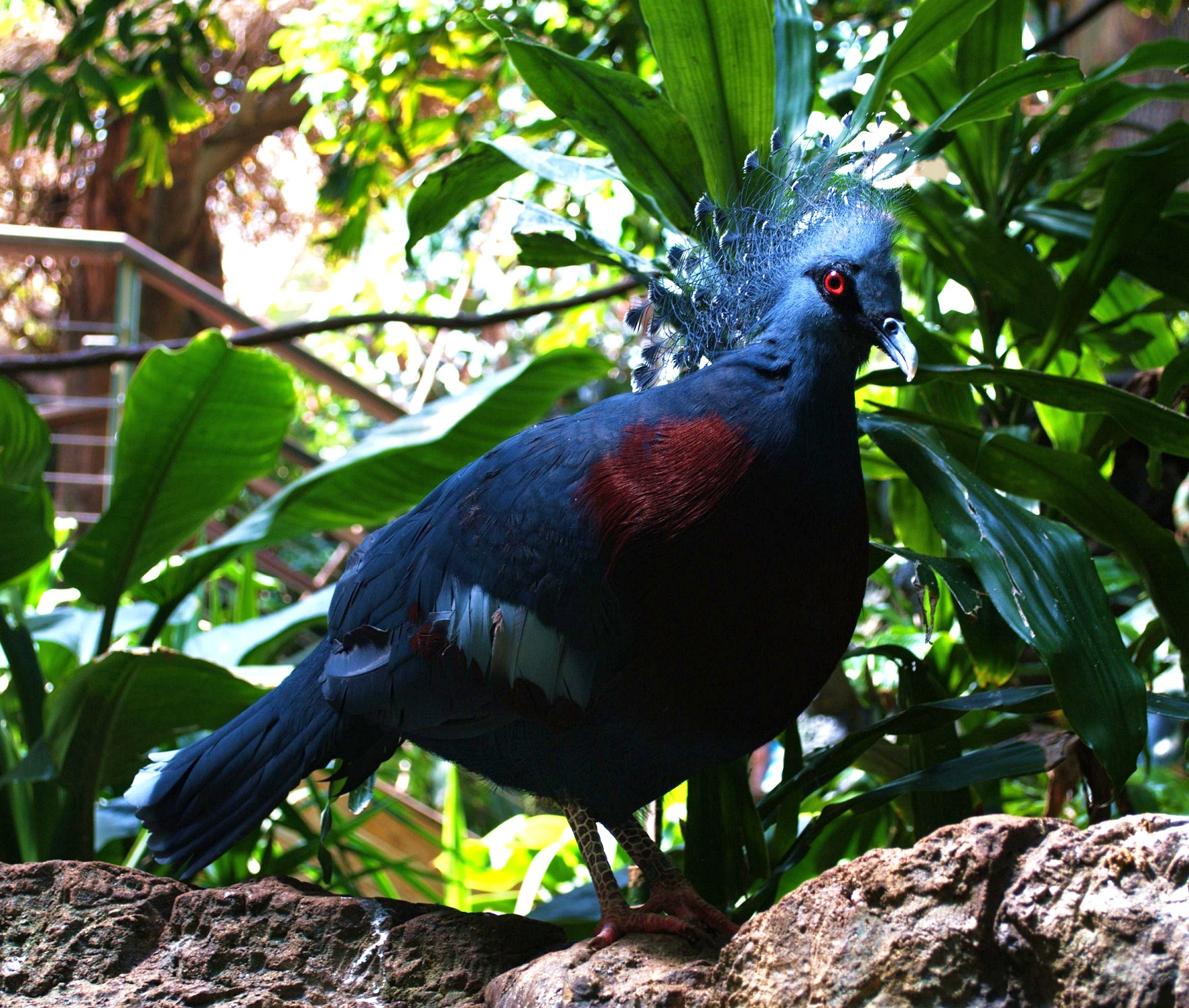
Victoria crowned pigeon at Central Park Zoo, NYC, New York

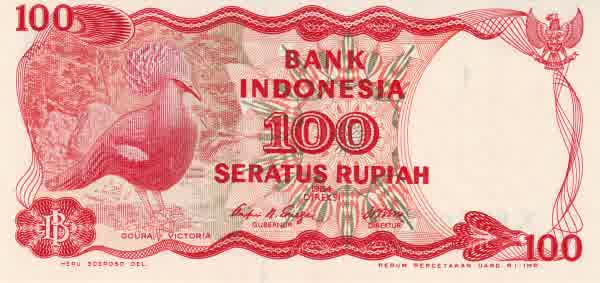
Victoria crowned pigeon in the Indonesian 100-rupiah banknote

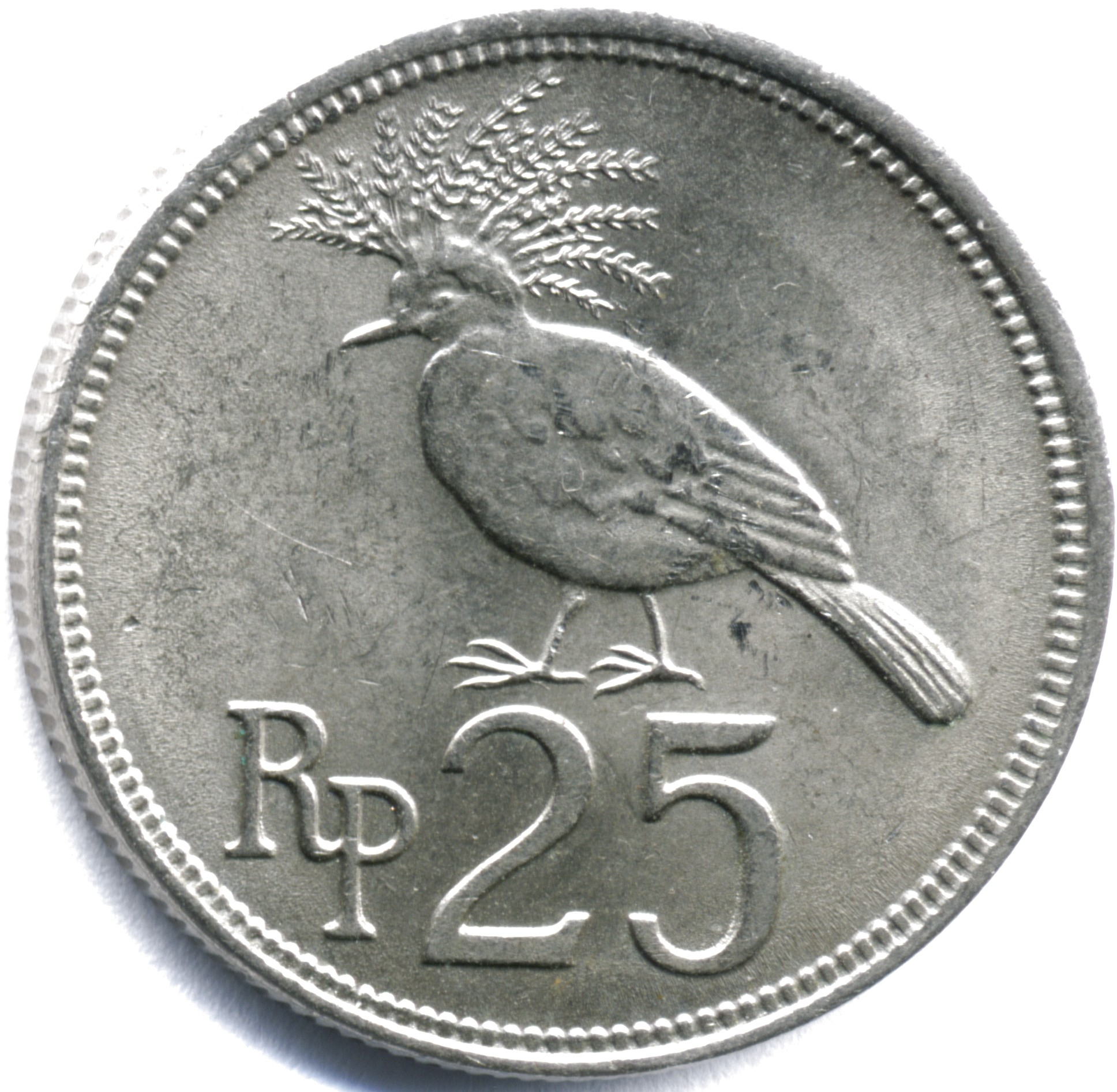
Victoria crowned pigeon in the Indonesian 25-rupiah coin

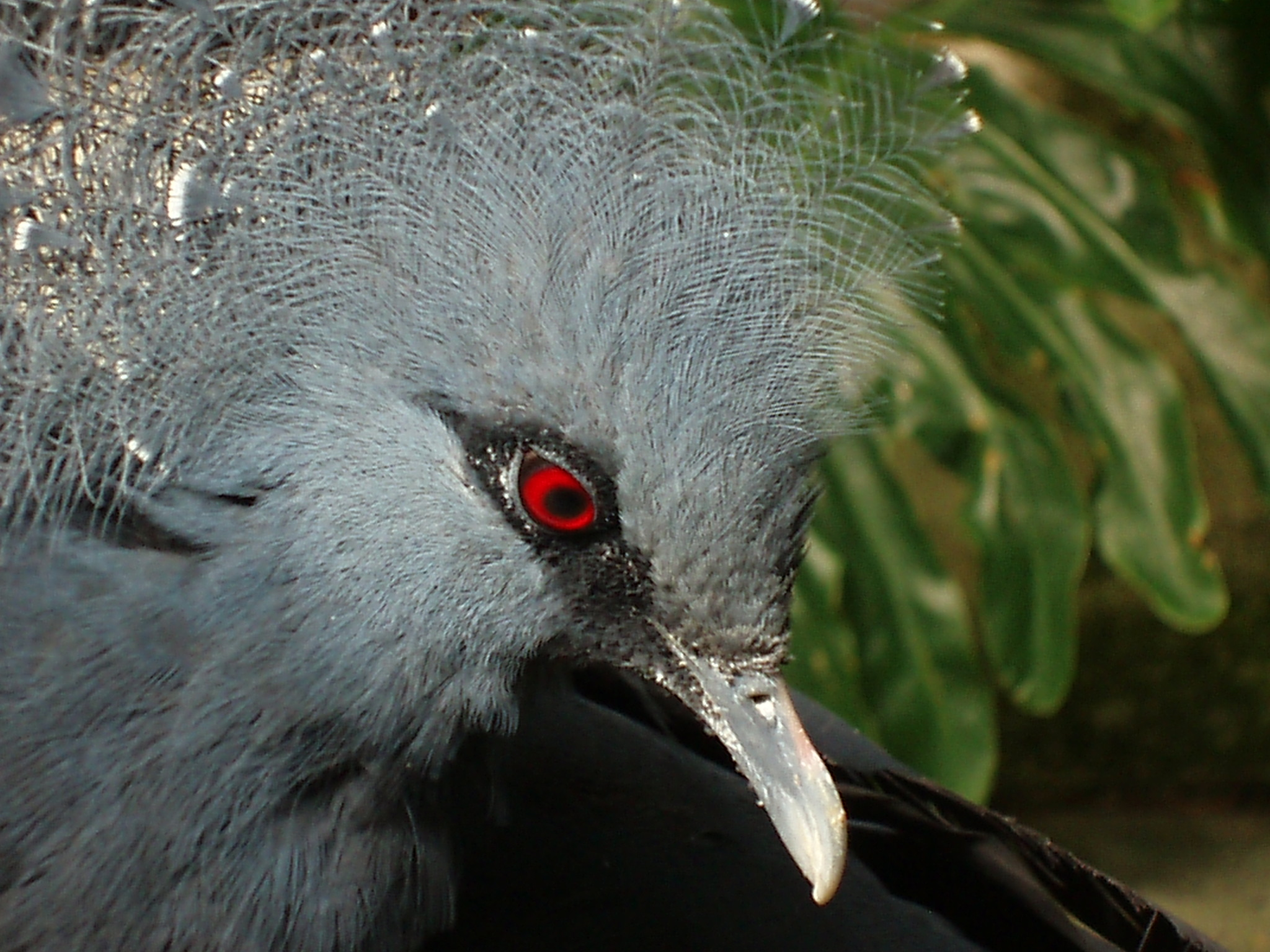

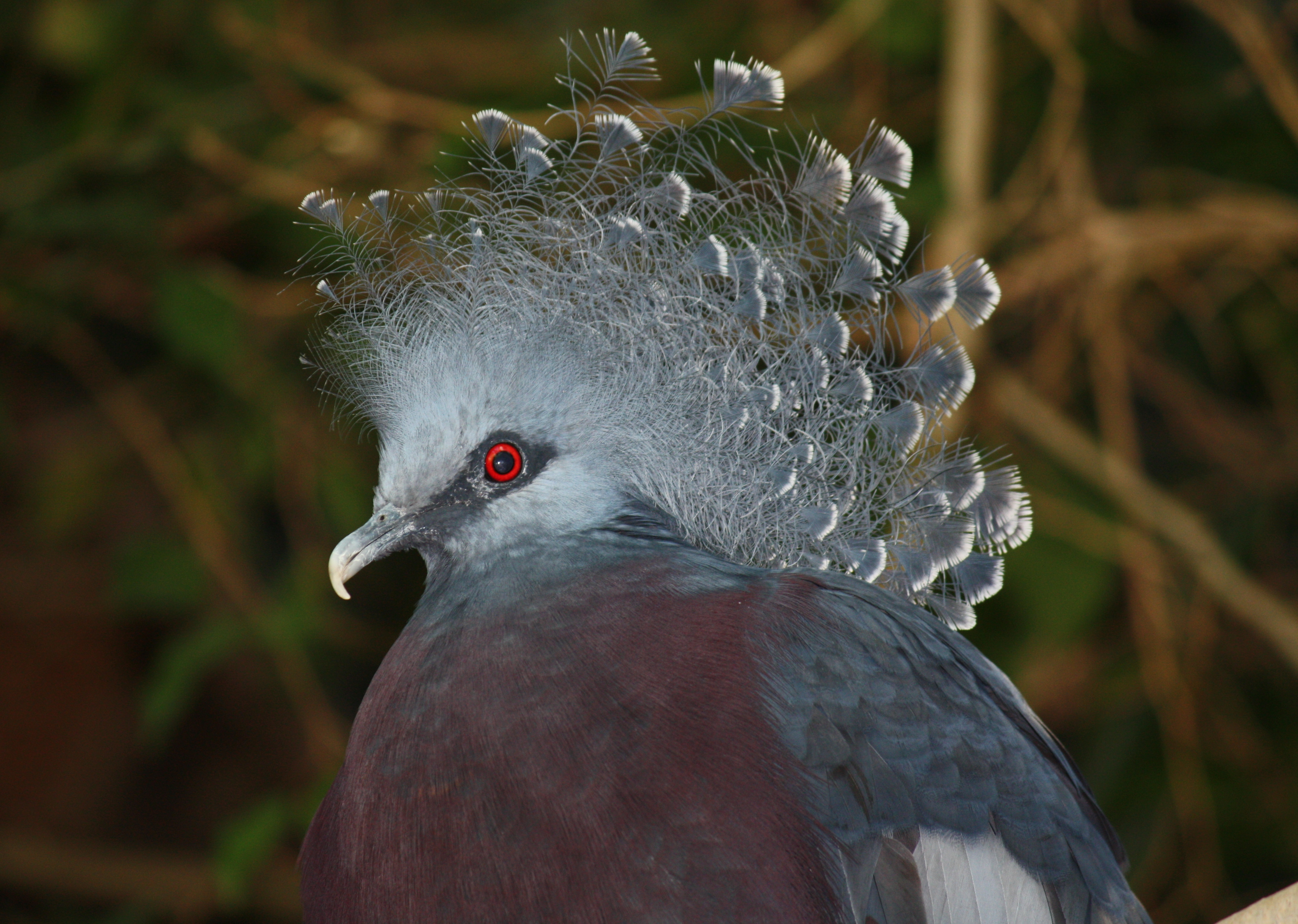

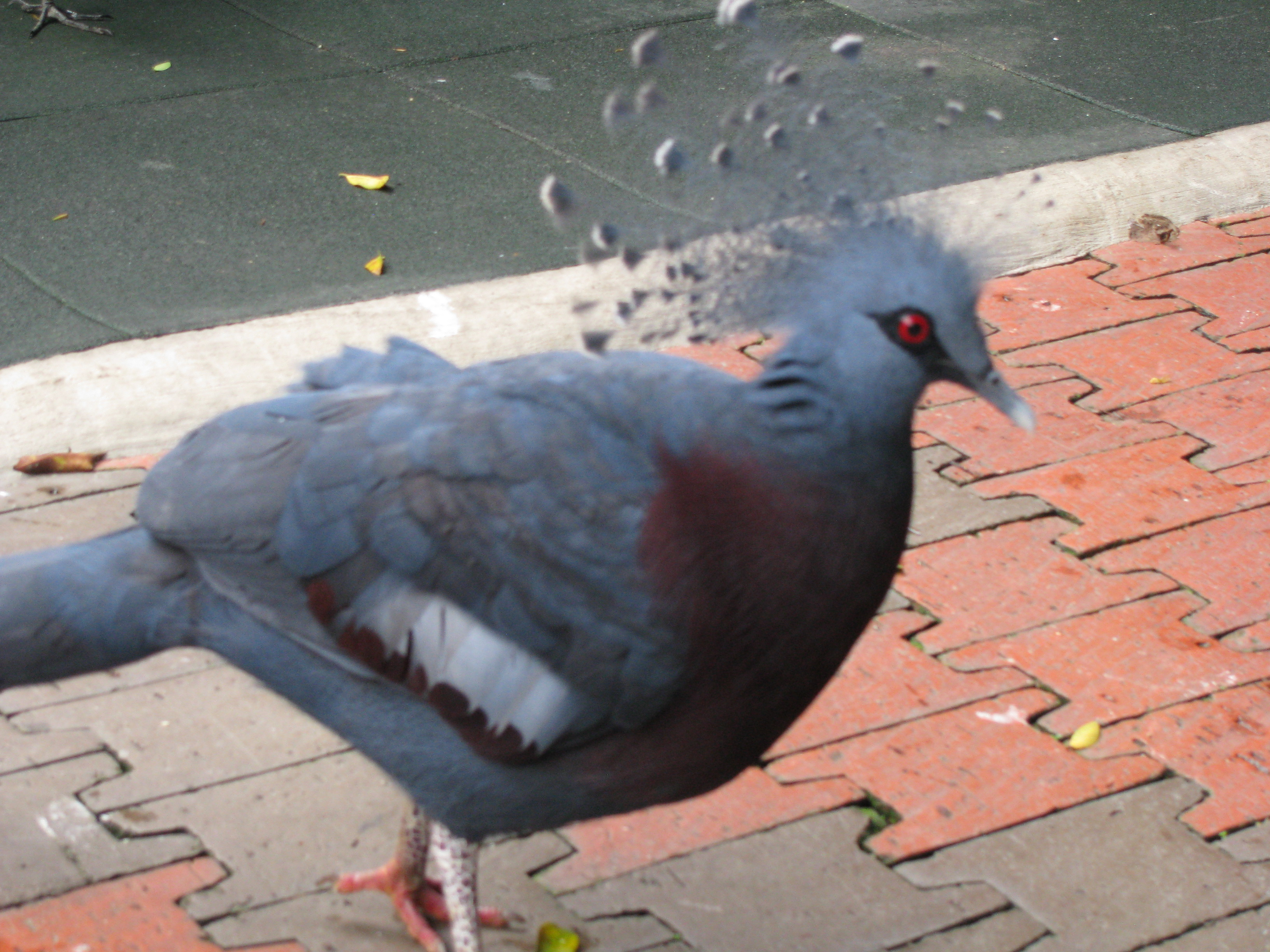

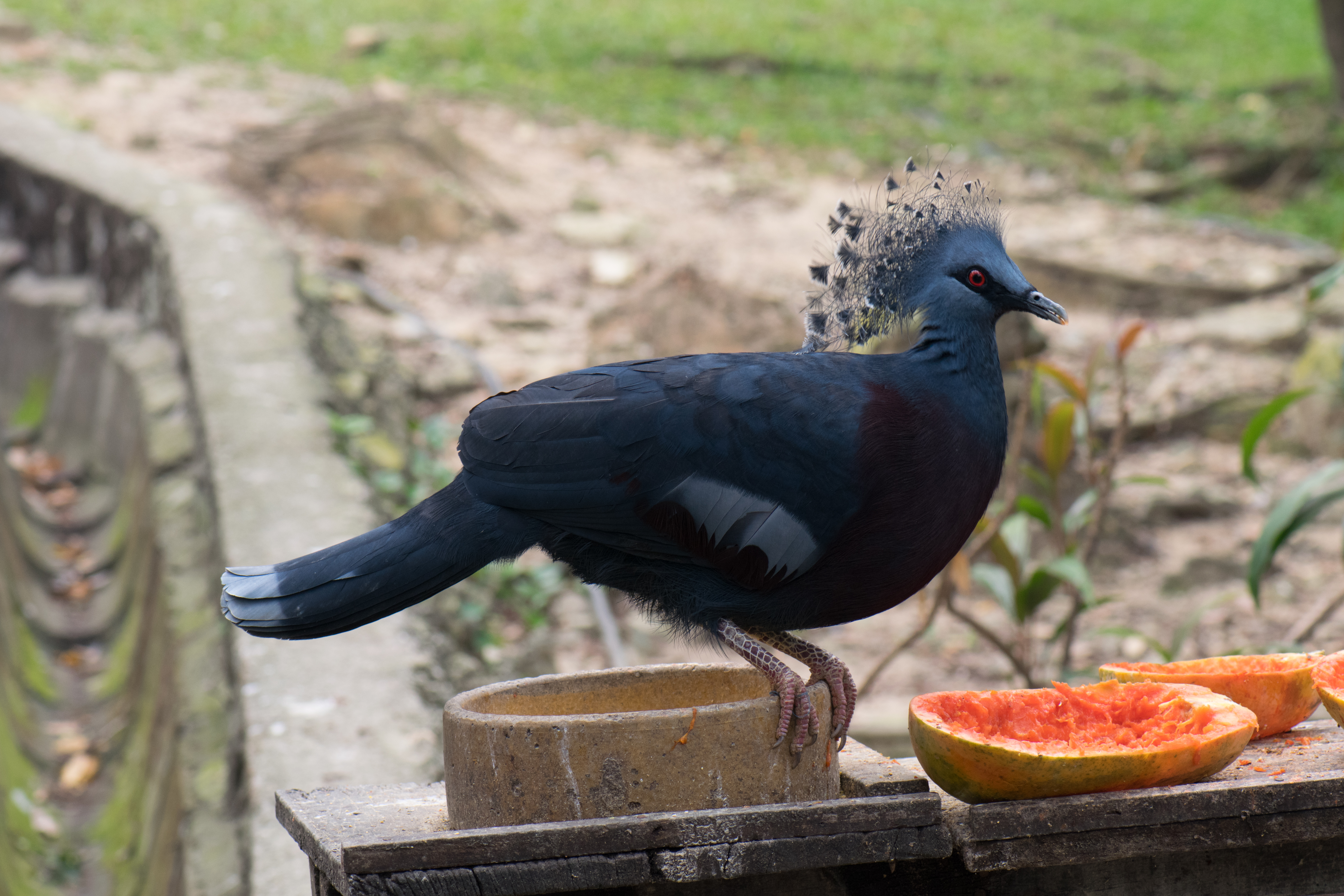

Victoria Crowned Pigeon standing with plants
