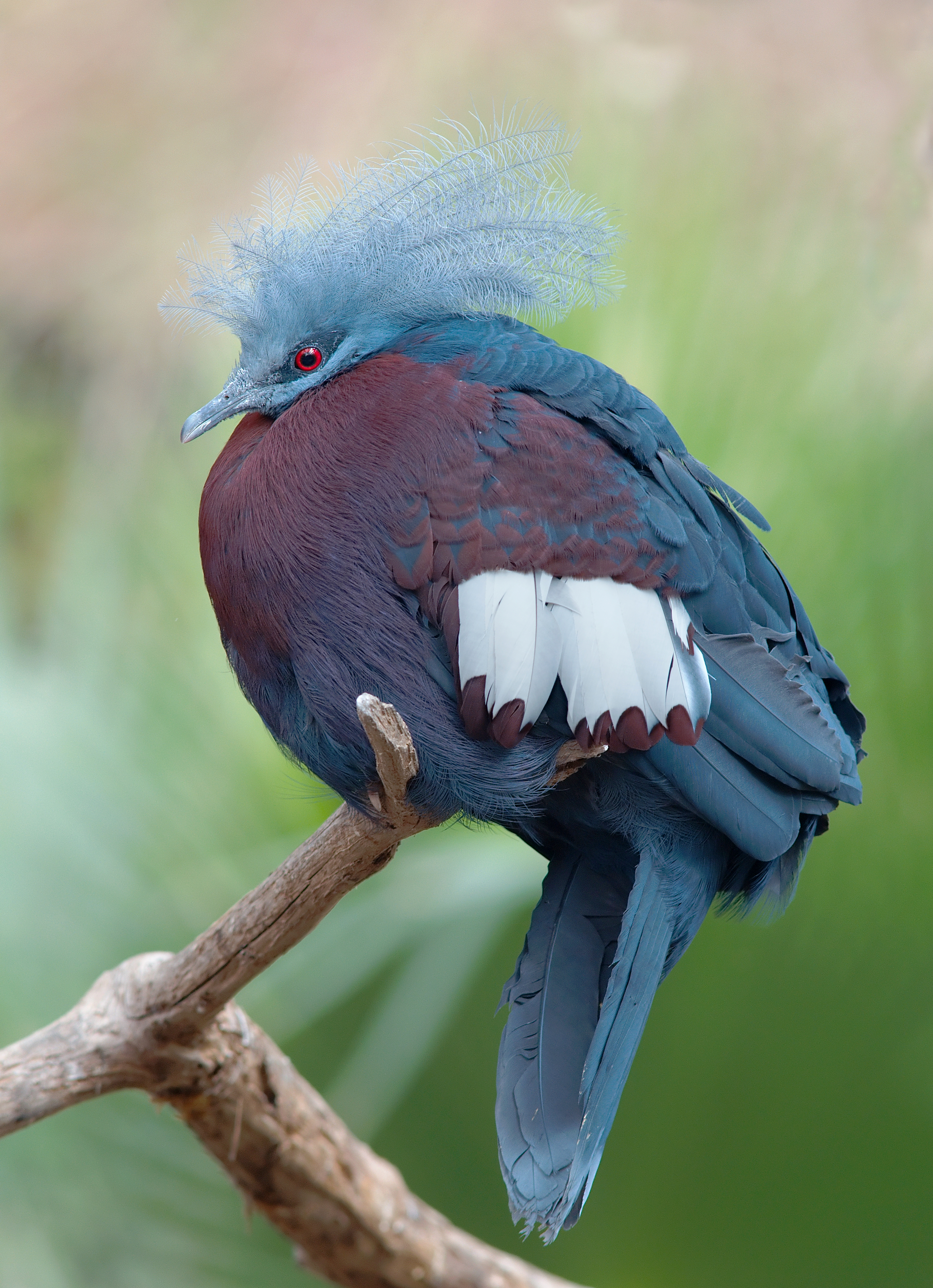

Conservation status
- Near Threatened (IUCN 3.1)
- CITES Appendix II

Scientific classification
- Kingdom: Animalia
- Phylum: Chordata
- Class: Aves
- Order: Columbiformes
- Family: Columbidae
- Genus: Goura
- Species: G. sclaterii

Binomial name
- Goura sclaterii Salvadori, 1876

= Sclater's crowned pigeon =

Species of bird

Sclater's crowned pigeon (Goura sclaterii) is a large, terrestrial pigeon confined to the southern lowland forests of New Guinea. This pigeon was previously considered as conspecific with Scheepmaker's crowned pigeon (Goura scheepmakeri) with the English name "southern crowned pigeon".

== Description ==
It has a bluish-grey plumage with elaborate blue lacy crests, red iris and very deep maroon breast. Both sexes have a similar appearance. It is 66–73 cm (26–29 in) in length and weighs 2.00–2.24 kg (4.41–4.94 lb).

== Taxonomy ==
Sclater's crowned pigeon was originally described by the Italian zoologist Tommaso Salvadori in 1876. He introduced the current binomial name Goura sclaterii. The specific epithet sclaterii was chosen to honour the English ornithologist Philip Sclater (1829–1913). A molecular phylogenetic study published in 2018 found that Sclater's crowned pigeon was most closely related to the western crowned pigeon (Goura cristata).

== Conservation ==
Being tame and heavily hunted for its meat and plumes, Sclater's crowned pigeon is evaluated as near threatened on the IUCN Red List of Threatened Species. It is listed in Appendix II of CITES.
