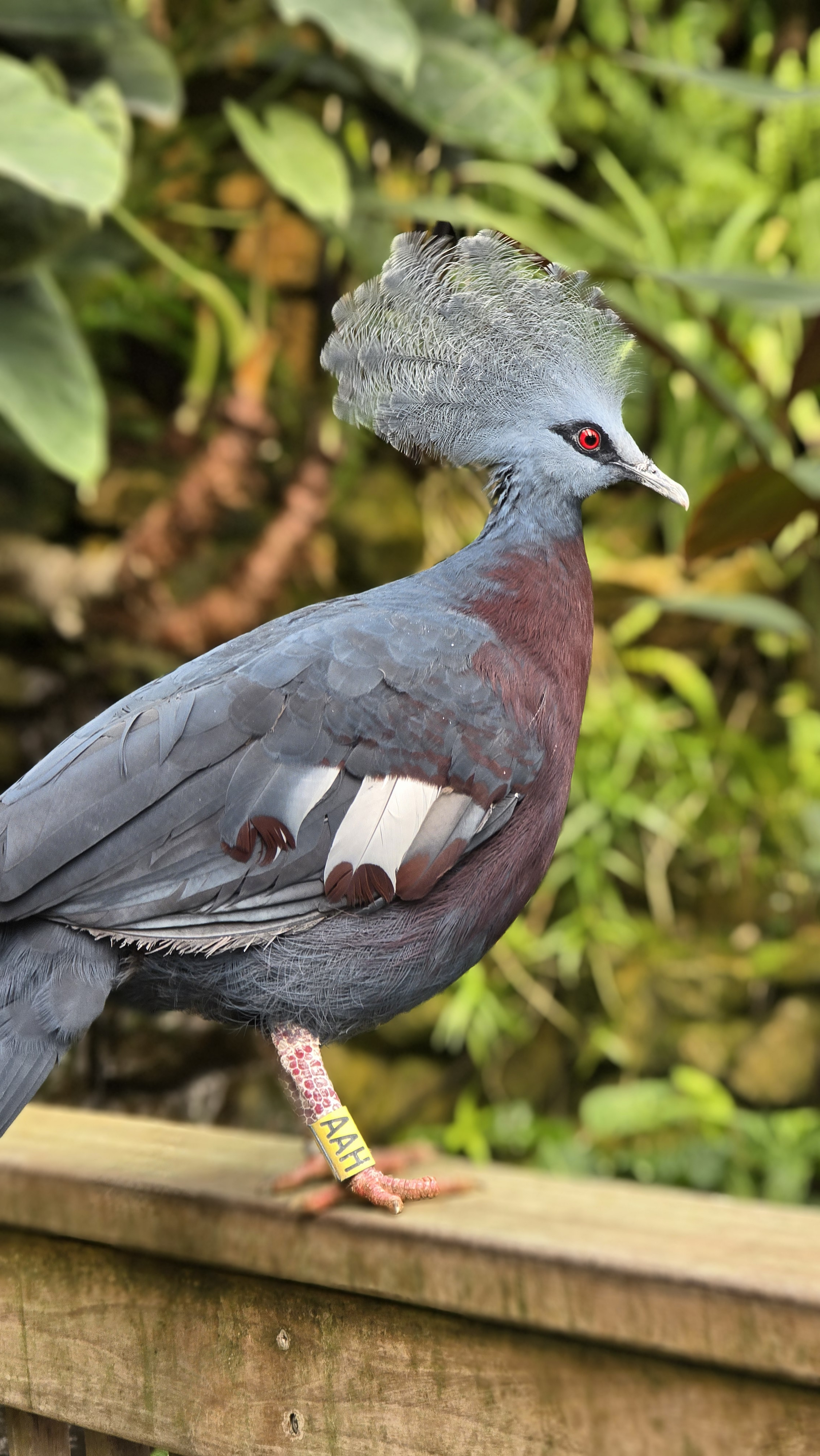

Conservation status
- Vulnerable (IUCN 3.1)
- CITES Appendix II

Scientific classification
- Kingdom: Animalia
- Phylum: Chordata
- Class: Aves
- Order: Columbiformes
- Family: Columbidae
- Genus: Goura
- Species: G. scheepmakeri

Binomial name
- Goura scheepmakeri Finsch, 1876

= Scheepmaker's crowned pigeon =

Species of bird found in New Guinea

Scheepmaker's crowned pigeon (Goura scheepmakeri) is a large, terrestrial pigeon confined to the lowland forests of south eastern New Guinea. It has a bluish-grey plumage with elaborate blue lacy crests, red iris and very deep maroon breast. Both sexes have a similar appearance. It is on average 70 cm (28 in) long and weighs 2,250 grams (4.96 lb), making this the second largest living pigeon species behind the Victoria crowned pigeon.

== Taxonomy ==
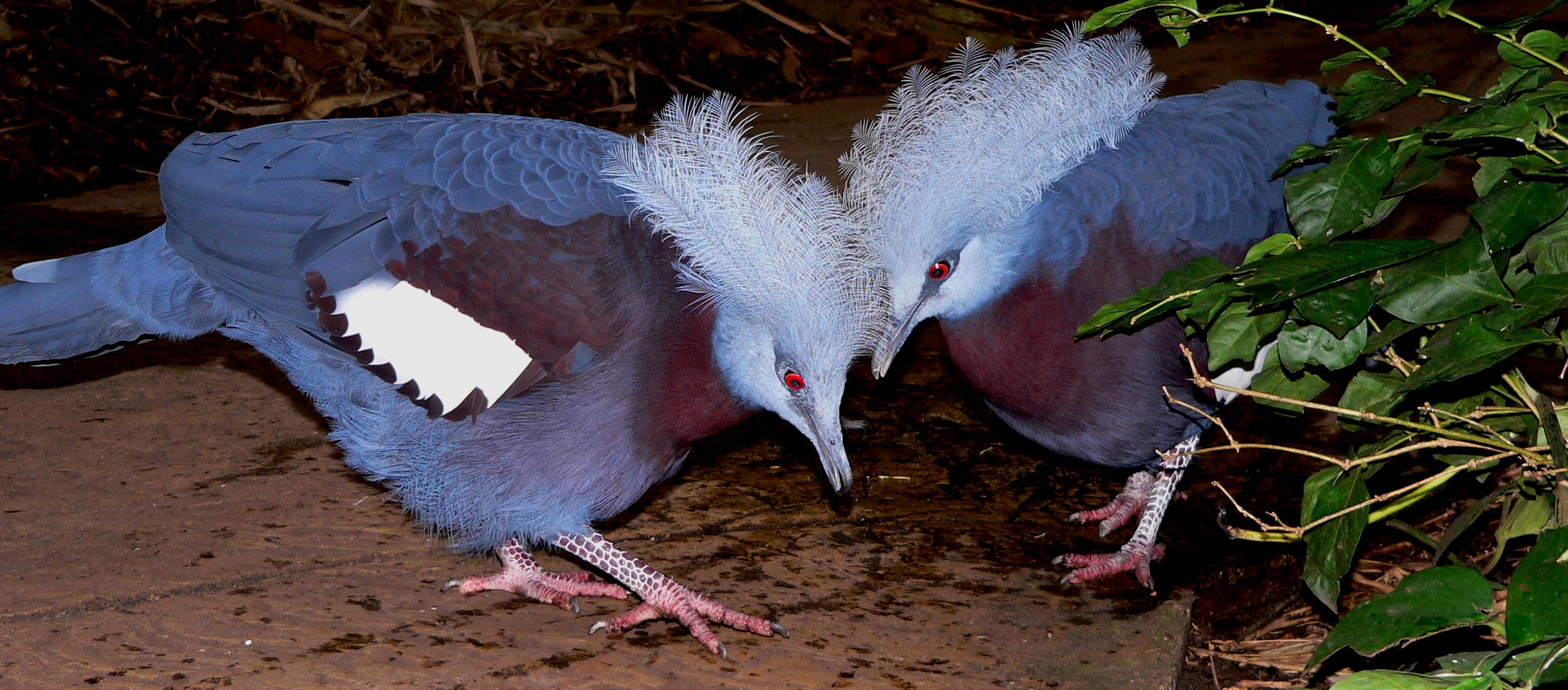
Scheepmaker's crowned pigeon pair

This species was first described by the German zoologist Otto Finsch who received a live bird from the dealer C. Scheepmaker in Amsterdam Zoo and named it after him. Scheepmaker's crowned pigeon was previously considered as conspecific with Sclater's crowned pigeon (Goura sclaterii) with the English name southern crowned-pigeon. A molecular phylogenetic study published in 2018 found that Scheepmaker's crowned pigeon was most closely related to the Victoria crowned pigeon (Goura victoria).

Being tame and heavily hunted for its meat and plumes, Scheepmaker's crowned pigeon is evaluated as Vulnerable on the IUCN Red List of Threatened Species. It is listed in Appendix II of CITES.
