= John Leonard Harrison =

British zoologist

John Leonard Harrison (1917–1972) was a British zoologist.

He came to Singapore as a major of the British army in 1945 where he met his later wife Song Kiew Ying. He worked as a zoologist at the Queensland Institute of Medical Research in Australia in 1951. In 1961, he was an associate professor of zoology at Singapore's Nanyang University. In 1963 he moved to the National University of Singapore to become a professor of Zoology. His son Bernard Harrison was chief executive officer of the Singapore Zoo from 1983 to 2002.

== Publications (selected) ==
- 1954: Malayan Squirrels (Including Tree-Shrews and the Flying Lemur)
- 1955: The Apes and Monkeys of Malaya (including the Slow Loris)
- 1956: Malayan Animal Life
- 1962: The food of some Innisfail [Queensland] mammals
- 1963: Recommended vernacular names for Malaysian mammals
- 1964: Guide to mammals of the Malay Peninsula
- 1964: An Introduction to the Mammals of Sabah
- 1966: An introduction to mammals of Singapore and Malaya
