= Bernard Harrison (zoologist) =

Zoologist based in Singapore

- Born: Bernard Ming-Deh Harrison; 1951 (age 74–75); Malaysia
- Education: University of Manchester
- Occupation: Zoologist
- Years active: 1981–present
- Children: 2
- Parents: John Leonard Harrison (father); Song Kiew Ying (mother)

Bernard Ming-Deh Harrison (born 1951) is a zoologist who was the executive director of the Singapore Zoo from 1981 to 2002.

== Early life ==
Harrison was born in Malaysia. His father, John Leonard Harrison, was a retired major in the British army and a zoologist who specialised in rodent-borne diseases. His mother, Song Kiew Ying, was a former nurse. The junior Harrison studied zoology and psychology at the University of Manchester, and returned to Singapore in 1973 to work as a curator of zoology at the Singapore Zoological Gardens.

== Career ==
Harrison became the executive director of the Singapore Zoo in 1981. In 1994, he founded the Night Safari—the first of its kind. On 2 July 2002, he announced his resignation, and was succeeded by Singapore Tourism Board marketing director Asad Shiraz. During Harrison's tenure, the Singapore Zoo saw record-breaking attendance; according to the BBC, it became "one of the most successful in Asia with its open concept of animal display." In an interview with The Straits Times, he described the last couple of years at the zoo as "pretty bloody boring". The Straits Times writer Yong Hui Mien described Harrison as "Singapore's Doctor Dolittle", although the zoo's celebrity orangutan Ah Meng reportedly disliked him.

Harrison opined that a majority of zoos worldwide were mismanaged: "If I could, I would shut down 90% of the 10,000 zoos in the world. The world is full of horrible stink holes that call themselves zoos." A biography of Harrison, written by Singapore Management University English literature professor Kirpal Singh and titled Naked Ape, Naked Boss, was published in 2014.

== Personal life ==
In his thirties, Harrison wrote a novel titled Malacca And Beyond (Media Masters), as well as an unpublished poetry anthology whose working title was No Leaf Unturned. In 1997, Harrison separated from his second wife, landscape gardener Nazli; he attributed the failure of their ten-year marriage to his working long hours at the zoo. In 2002, he married former corporate trainer Tina Lim, with whom he established the zoo design consultancy Bernard Harrison & Friends. Harrison has two children, both from his second marriage.
