= Bernard Harrison =

Bernard Harrison may refer to:

- Bernard Harrison (sportsman) (1934–2006), English cricketer and footballer
- Bernard Harrison (zoologist) (born 1951), Singaporean zoologist
