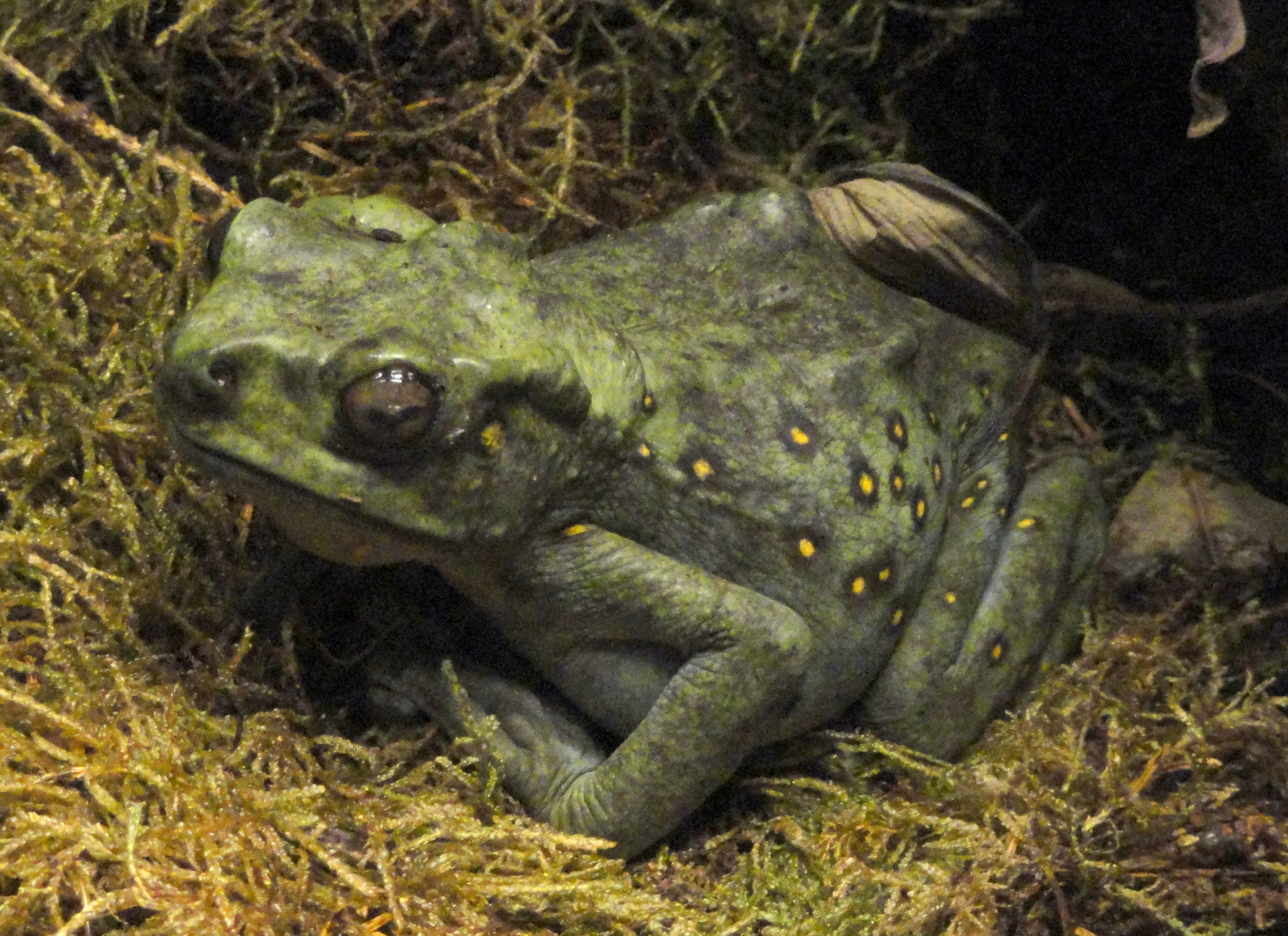
- Rentapia hosii

Scientific classification
- Kingdom: Animalia
- Phylum: Chordata
- Class: Amphibia
- Order: Anura
- Family: Bufonidae
- Genus: Rentapia; Chan, Grismer, Zachariah, Brown, and Abraham, 2016

Type species
- Nectophryne hosii Boulenger, 1892

Species
- 2 species (see text)

= Rentapia =

Genus of amphibians

Rentapia is a genus of true toads, family Bufonidae. It is endemic to Southeast Asia and occurs in the Malay Peninsula (including extreme southern peninsular Thailand), Borneo, and Sumatra. It was erected in 2016 resolve the polyphyly of Pedostibes.

== Etymology ==
The generic epithet honors the legendary Iban warrior Libau Rentap, "a great war chief, freedom fighter, and Malaysian national hero."

== Description ==
Rentapia are relatively large toads—in the larger species (Rentapia hosii), males can grow to 80 mm (3.1 in) and females to 105 mm (4.1 in) in snout–vent length. Interorbital cranial crests are absent. The parotoid glands are large and distinct, and may be oval, circular, or triangular in dorsal view. The fingers have basal webbing and tips that are expanded into flat discs. The feet are fully webbed on all toes except the fourth one. Males have nuptial pads.

== Ecology ==
Adult Rentapia are primarily arboreal and live in riparian vegetation around small- to moderately-sized forest streams. The eggs are small and pigmented and laid as strings.

== Species ==
There are three recognized species:

- Rentapia everetti (Boulenger, 1896)
- Rentapia flavomaculata Chan, Abraham, and Badli-Sham, 2020
- Rentapia hosii (Boulenger, 1892)

The formerly recognised Rentapia rugosa is a synonym of R. everetti.
