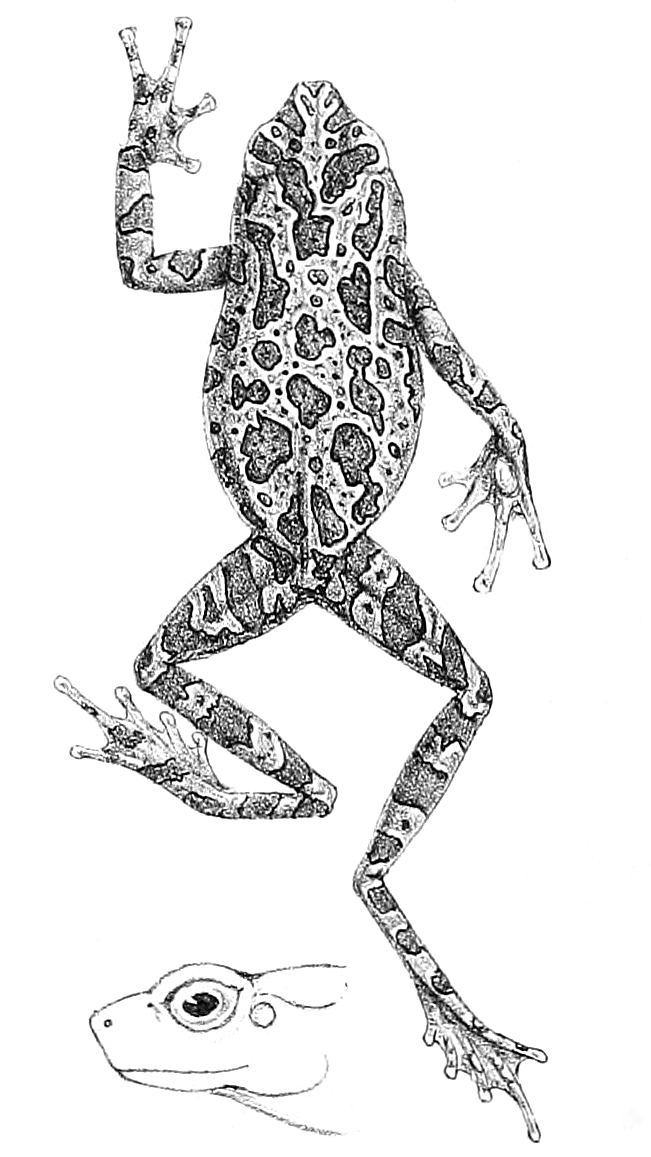

Conservation status
- Least Concern (IUCN 3.1)

Scientific classification
- Kingdom: Animalia
- Phylum: Chordata
- Class: Amphibia
- Order: Anura
- Family: Bufonidae
- Genus: Rentapia
- Species: R. everetti

Binomial name
- Rentapia everetti (Boulenger, 1896)

Synonyms
- Nectophryne everetti Boulenger, 1896; Pedostibes everetti (Boulenger, 1896); Pedostibes rugosus Inger, 1958; Rentapia rugosus (Inger, 1958)

= Rentapia everetti =

Species of amphibian

Rentapia everetti, also known as Everett's Asian tree toad or marbled tree toad, is a species of toad in the family Bufonidae. It is endemic to Borneo and occurs in both Malaysia, Brunei, and Indonesia.

Rentapia everetti is an arboreal toad found in hilly lowland, and submontane, tropical primary moist forest and good secondary forest. The size of these toads is unknown. Breeding probably takes place in small, slow-moving, clear, rocky streams.

Rentapia everetti are recognizable by their morphological traits, including large oval parotoid glands, numerous round warts, and a sharp tarsal fold.
