= Inuka =

Polar bear at the Singapore Zoo

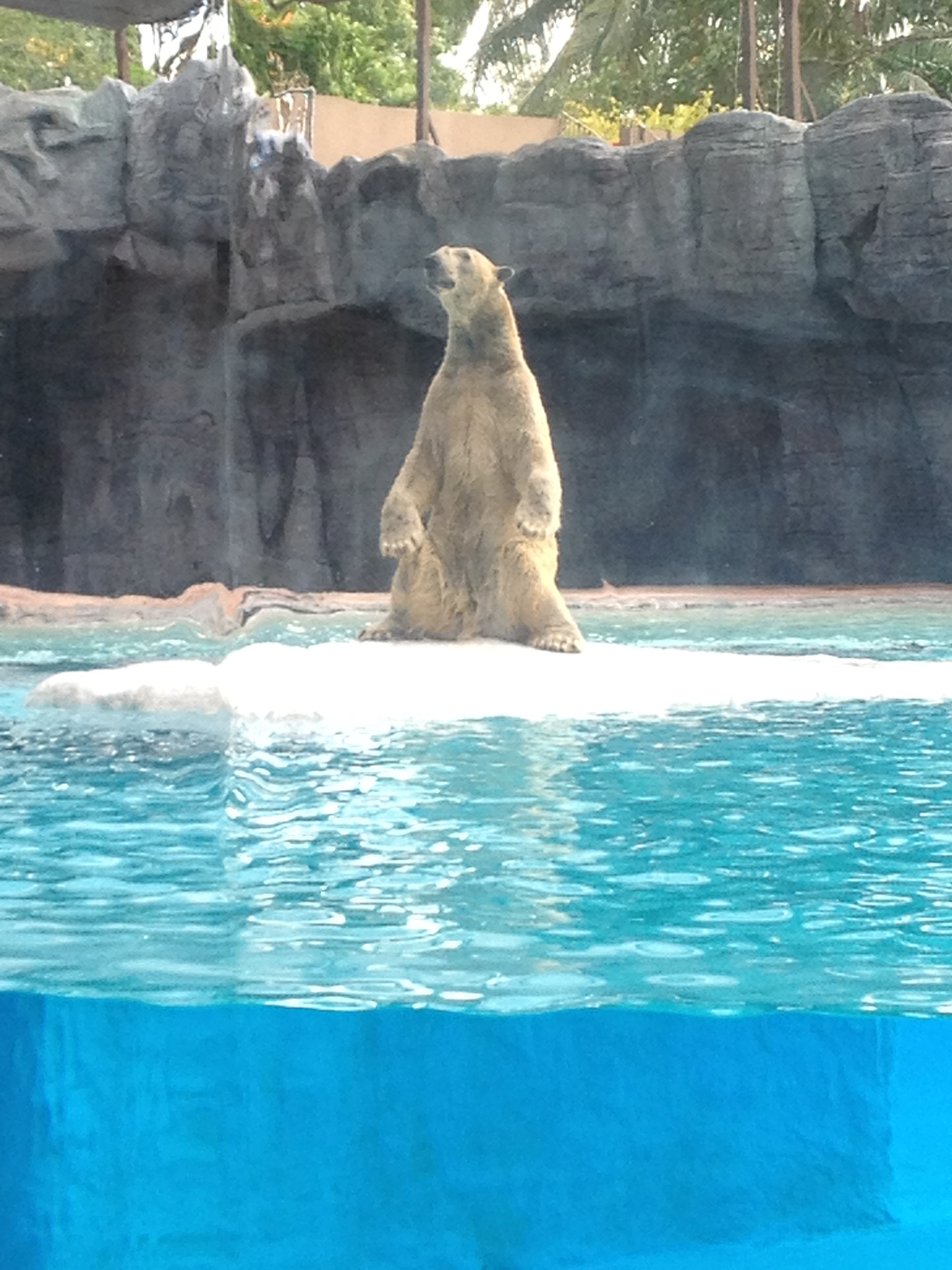
- Inuka, pictured in December 2013
- Sex: Male
- Born: 26 December 1990; Singapore Zoo
- Died: 25 April 2018 (aged 27); Singapore Zoo
- Parents: Nanook and Sheba

Inuka (Inuit for "foreboding strength") was a male polar bear and one of the mascots of the Singapore Zoo. Born and housed in a climate-controlled enclosure, he was the world's only "tropical polar bear".

== Biography ==
Inuka was born in the Singapore Zoo in 1990, the result of an extensive breeding programme run by the zoo and was the first and only polar bear to be born in the tropics. There have been four polar bears at Singapore Zoo altogether—Nanook, Sheba and their offspring Inuka, as well as another female, Anana.

Nanook and Sheba arrived at the Singapore Zoo in 1978, from Assiniboine Park Zoo in Canada and Cologne Zoo in Germany respectively. Nanook was 11 months old and was captured in the wild, while Sheba was 14 months old and born in captivity. To ease them in, they arrived in the early hours of the morning when the temperature was coolest. Like most zoo animals, one of each sex was brought in for mating and conservation purposes. Anana, a female polar bear caught in the wild, arrived from Canada in 1979. She died in 1999.

On 26 December 1990, Sheba gave birth to a 350-gram male cub. The cub was named Inuka, chosen from amongst 390 names suggested in a nationwide naming contest. More than 10,000 entries were received, including names like Arctos and Shardik.

In 1993, The Straits Times named Inuka as one of "28 people and things to call our own", alongside national swimmer Joscelin Yeo, the Vanda Miss Joaquim and the Singapore Sling.

Inuka's father, Nanook, died on 29 December 1995 at the age of 18. He had been suffering from chronic heart disease and lung disease. The Singapore-born polar bear was raised by his mother Sheba. Sheba died on 15 November 2012 at the age of 35. She had been under treatment since September 2012 for loss of strength in her hind limbs, but her condition worsened and was put down after a close evaluation showed that her prognosis was poor.

In 2000, 300 guests had free cake at Inuka's 10th birthday bash. In 2001, Inuka was named by the Singapore Zoo as a possible replacement for the ageing orangutan Ah Meng as the zoo's mascot, among other candidates like elephant Sang Raja and orangutan Hong Bao. However, nothing materialised.

Inuka has been adopted by the SPH Foundation, which is the charity arm of Singapore Press Holdings (SPH), since birth. SPH co-organises events together with Wildlife Reserves Singapore (WRS), such as his birthday parties.

=== Habitat ===
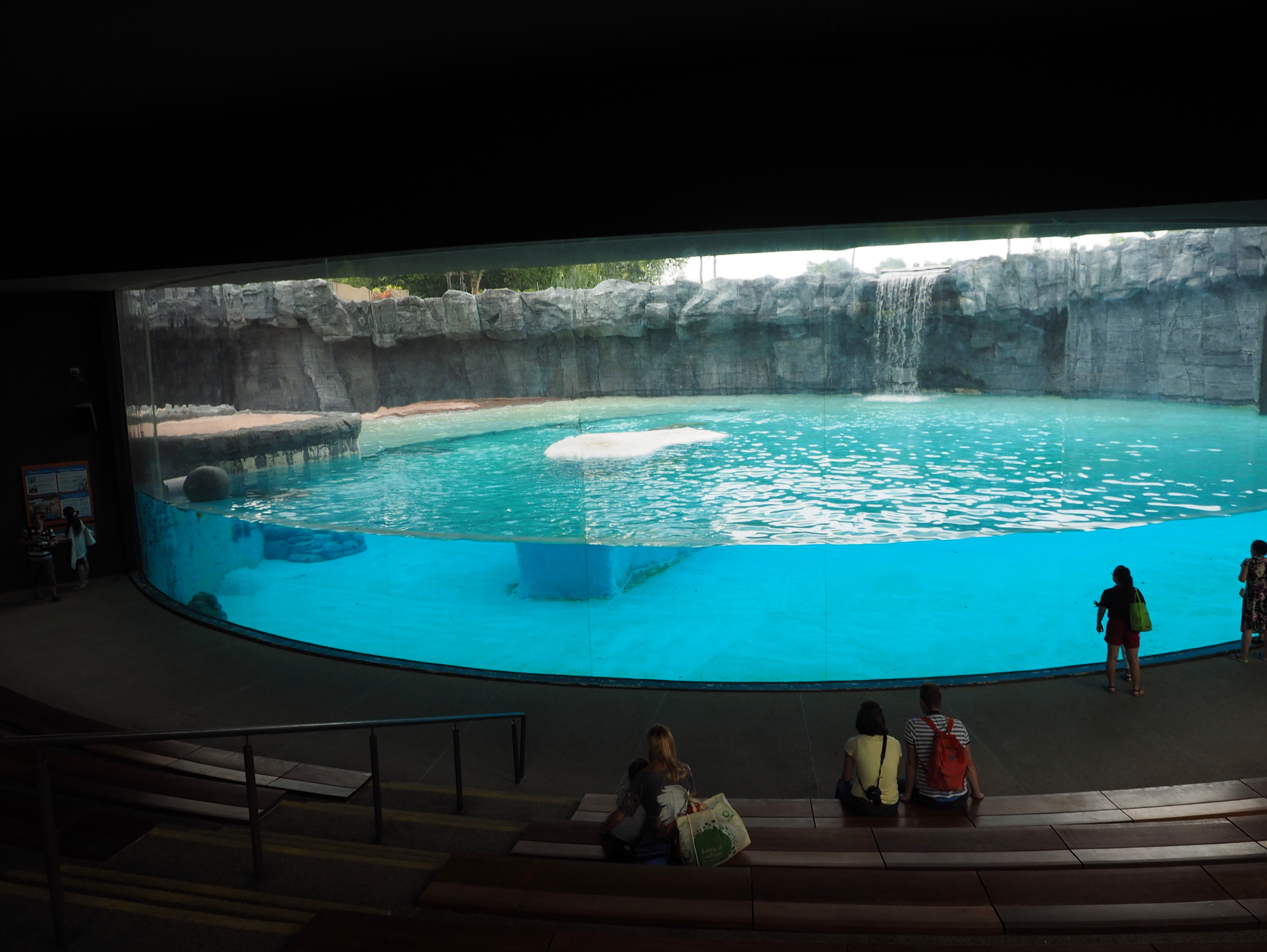
Part of Inuka's enclosure in 2015

In 2006, it was revealed that the Singapore Zoo had contacted Polar Bear International Studbook keepers based in Rostock Zoo in Germany to have Inuka included in the list of bears available for transfer as part of an "animal exchange programme", such that Inuka would be moved to a zoo in Europe when his mother passes on.

The zoo decided to focus on polar bears in 2006 as it could be their final year in Singapore. The SPH Foundation will sponsor Inuka's upkeep until he is transferred. Inuka's 16th birthday party in 2006 saw the attendance of more than fifty guests, and included an ice carving as well as a birthday cake made of ice filled with apples and fish, topped with sixteen carrot sticks representing candles.

In May 2007, the Singapore Zoo announced that Inuka will stay at the zoo even after Sheba dies, contrary to the earlier decision to send him to a temperate-country zoo when that happens. The decision was made on the recommendation of the zoo's Animal Welfare and Ethics Committee. However, there were no plans to import any more polar bears. Meanwhile, the zoo stated it was looking into improving the facilities, including providing better water quality and a soft area for them to walk on.

In August 2010, WRS announced that the polar bears in the Singapore Zoo would be the highlight of a Frozen Tundra exhibit in the $180 million River Safari theme park, which was due to open in 2012 on 12ha of land between the zoo and the Night Safari. This is contrary to the earlier claims by the zoo to focus more on Tropical rainforest animals, suitable for the weather conditions in Singapore. ACRES congratulated the zoo for building a bigger and climate-controlled enclosure for the bears, but criticised the zoo for contradicting its own message with regard to fighting global warming.

In 2013, it was announced that the previously announced Frozen Tundra would be moved to the Singapore Zoo, instead of being inside the River Safari. Some new species such as wolverines and raccoon dogs have also been added to the exhibit.

=== Health concerns ===
In 2004, Inuka and his mother had algae growing on their hair shafts and visitors thought that the zoo actually painted them green. The zoo said that the algae was harmless and singled out the hot, humid climate as the cause. To remove the algae, the zoo first sprayed the two bears with hydrogen peroxide.

That same year in 2004, controversies started over the polar bear enclosure at the zoo and Inuka and Sheba's behaviour. The enclosure was a mere size of 391 m^{2} compared to its huge Arctic habitat which can spread an area of over 80,000 km^{2}.

The Animal Concerns Research and Education Society (ACRES) discussed with the zoo a proposal to move Inuka to a temperate country zoo. According to a study by the society in 2005, Sheba and Inuka were showing signs of behavioural and physical distress such as signs of heat stress, high levels of inactivity, high levels of abnormal stereotypic behaviour, and performing unusual behaviours such as waving and ringing a bell at feeding shows. ACRES claimed that the pool's temperature was at 17 °C, much higher than the water conditions in the Arctic. ACRES asked the zoo again to improve his enclosure.

The Singapore Zoo said the bears were kept in good conditions citing that Inuka was born in the tropics. It will not import anymore Arctic animals as it is planning to become a rainforest themed zoo. The zoo also spent S$200,000 upgrading the polar bears' facilities, installing another air-conditioner in the den and adding misting fans and netted shades over the enclosure to keep it at 22 °C.

In 2018, WRS announced that Inuka was less active than usual. He underwent a health examination on 3 April 2018 and the results revealed that his health was declining. His keepers reported that Inuka's activity levels had dipped noticeably and he preferred resting over the daily keeper interactions he used to enjoy. Daily interaction sessions at his exhibit were suspended.

A second health examination was conducted on 25 April 2018 to give further clarity on how he was faring. The results showed Inuka was not improving despite extensive treatment. Singapore Zoo decided not to revive him from anaesthesia and he was subsequently put down on 25 April 2018 at around 9:30am.

=== Preservation of Inuka’s body remains ===
According to The Straits Times, Inuka's skeletal remains will be preserved and used in schools for educational purposes.

== See also ==
- List of individual bears
- Ah Meng
