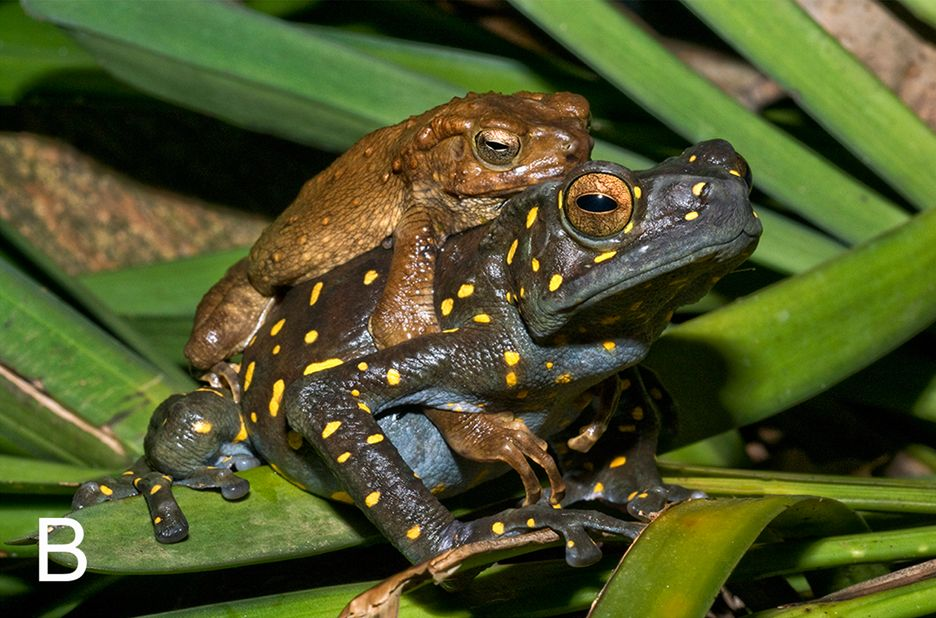
- Amplectic pair

Scientific classification
- Kingdom: Animalia
- Phylum: Chordata
- Class: Amphibia
- Order: Anura
- Family: Bufonidae
- Genus: Rentapia
- Species: R. flavomaculata

Binomial name
- Rentapia flavomaculata Chan, Abraham, and Badli-Sham, 2020

= Rentapia flavomaculata =

Species of amphibian

Rentapia flavomaculata, also known as the yellow-spotted tree toad, is a species of toad in the family Bufonidae. It is endemic to the Malay Peninsula (Thailand and Malaysia). Before being described as a distinct species in 2020, it was confused with Rentapia hosii.

== Etymology ==
The specific name flavomaculata is derived from Latin flavo (=yellow) and maculata (=spotted) and refers to the yellow spots that are diagnostic for this species.

== Description ==
Adult males measure 70–79 mm (2.8–3.1 in) and adult females 99–102 mm (3.9–4.0 in) in snout–vent length. The snout is angular, truncate in dorsal profile, but slightly projecting beyond the lower jaw in lateral profile. The eyes are large. The tympanum is distinct. The fingers have basal webbing and large terminal discs. The toes are webbed and bear small terminal discs. Females have mostly smooth skin. The base color is light yellow, which turns dark grey when stressed and/or handled. There are bright yellow spots on the back, side of head, flanks, dorsal surface of limbs, gular, ventrolateral region, and chest. Males are uniform brown to orangish and lack distinct patterns, but have a higher degree of tuberculation.

== Distribution ==
Rentapia flavomaculata is found in the Malay Peninsula south of the Isthmus of Kra, in southern Thailand and throughout Peninsular Malaysia. Rentapia from Sumatra have provisionally been assigned to Rentapia hosii but might represent Rentapia flavomaculata instead.

== Habitat ==
This species occurs in lowland forests; the elevational range typical for the genus is 25–525 m (82–1,722 ft) above sea level. Rentapia flavomaculata are arboreal, and females have been observed as high as 25 m (82 ft) above ground in the forest canopy near fast-flowing rivers. Females are most readily observed when they descend to breed in pools of water along small or moderately sized forest streams. Males call from elevated perches.

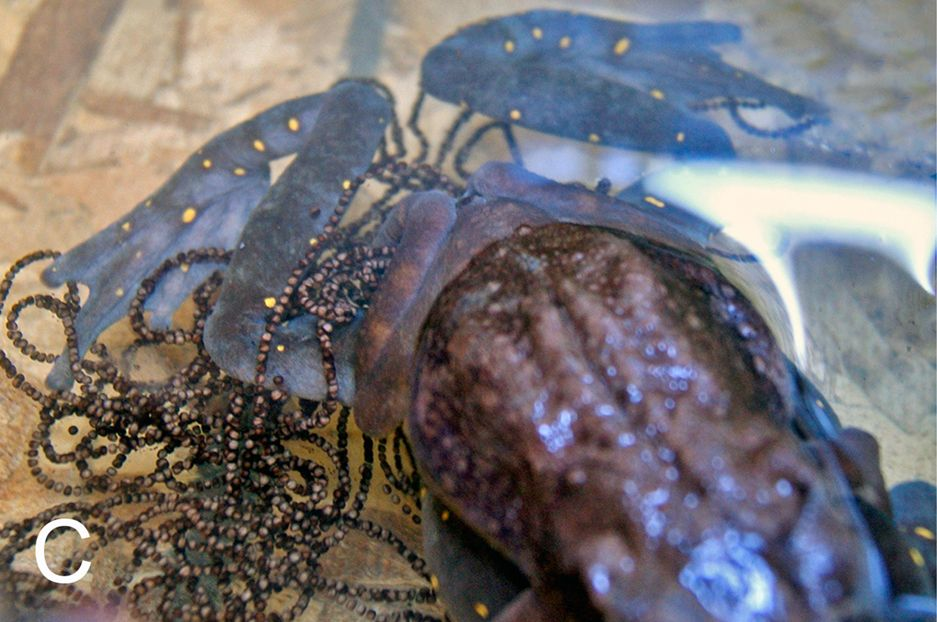
Rentapia flavomaculata showing oviposition of clutch as strings

== Conservation ==
As of November 2021, this species has not been included in the IUCN Red List of Threatened Species. In 2014, Rentapia hosii, which then included what now is Rentapia flavomaculata, was considered of "least concern".
