= Ah Meng =

Specific female Sumatran orangutan

- Ah Meng, an icon of the Singapore Zoo
- Species: Pongo abelii
- Sex: Female
- Born: c. 18 June 1960; Sumatra, Indonesia
- Died: 8 February 2008 (aged 47); Singapore Zoo
- Years active: 1960-2008
- Offspring: 5

Ah Meng (circa 18 June 1960 – 8 February 2008) (Chinese: 阿明) was a female Sumatran orangutan and a tourism icon of Singapore. Ah Meng was originally from Indonesia and was kept illegally in Singapore as a domestic pet before being recovered by a veterinarian in 1971. She was then eleven years old and was given a home at the Singapore Zoo.

Ah Meng was the head of her small clan, which lives in a large enclosure with about twenty other orangutans. She had five children, twelve grandchildren and five great-grandchildren.

She belonged to the Sumatran orangutan species, a rarer breed of orangutan now critically endangered due to illegal logging and poaching. There are about only 7,500 Sumatran orangutans left in the wild in the rainforests of Sumatra, Indonesia. Ah Meng died on 8 February 2008.

== Life ==
Ah Meng's family and her offspring: (from left) Satria, Sayang and Riau

Ah Meng was removed from her family in Indonesia and kept illegally as a domestic pet before being recovered by a veterinarian in 1971. She was then eleven years old and was given a home at the Singapore Zoo.

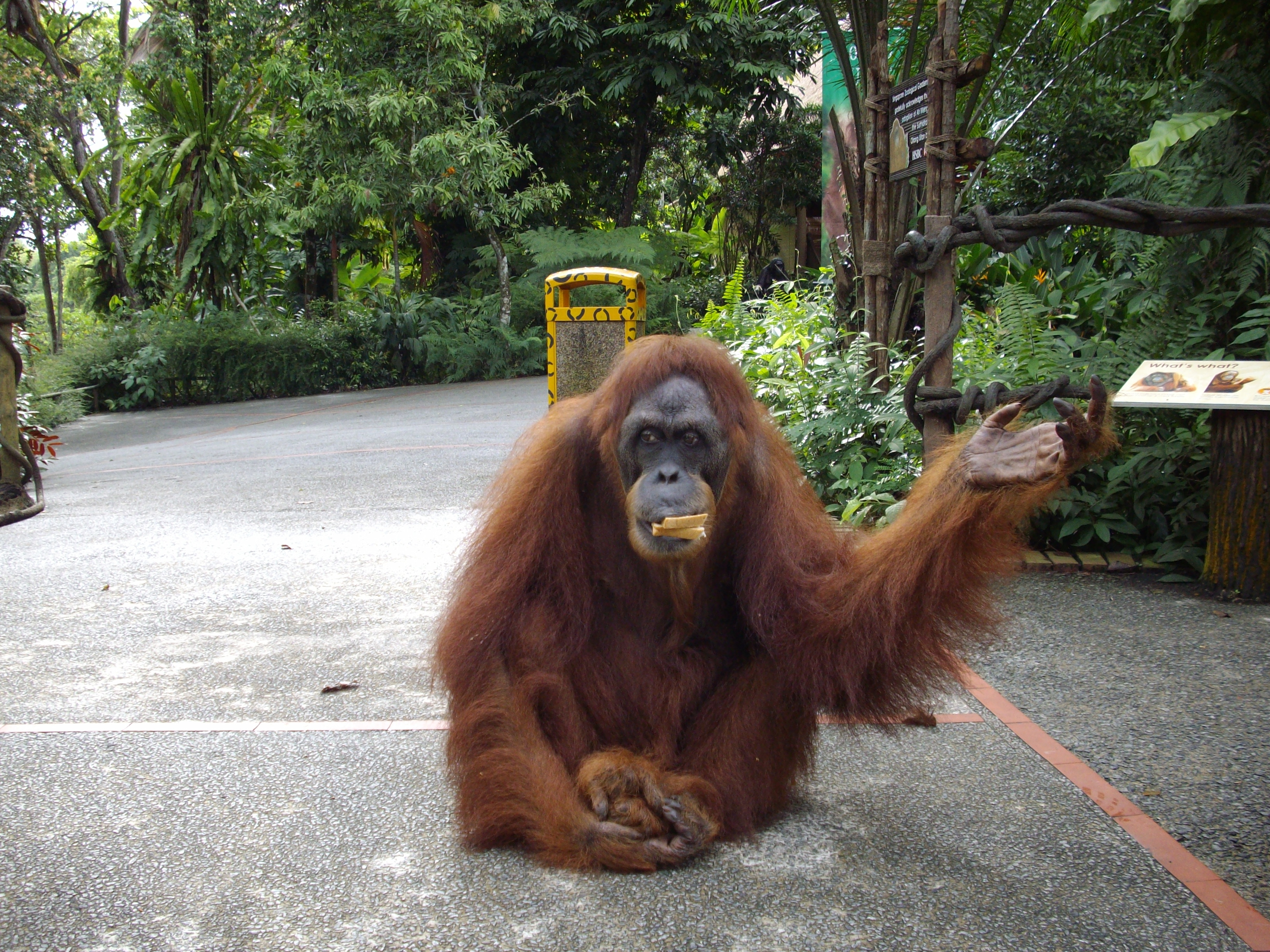
Ah Meng

Ah Meng was the poster girl of the Singapore Zoo. Pictures of her have been used in Singapore's tourism advertisements worldwide. She has also been featured in over 30 travel films and more than 300 articles. Some of the foreign dignitaries and celebrities that visited Ah Meng included Prince Philip, Michael Jackson and Steve Irwin.

In March 1982, during the shooting of a promotional video at MacRitchie Reservoir, Ah Meng climbed a tree and stayed there for two nights. On her way down, she fell seven stories and broke her right arm.

In 1992, the Singapore Tourism Promotion Board awarded Ah Meng a "Special Tourism Ambassador" award in honor of her contribution to Singapore tourism. She was the first non-human recipient to receive this award. She received a certificate and a stack of bananas.

In March 1992, Ah Meng attacked a French female research student who was studying orangutan behaviour and spent much time with Ah Meng's long-time keeper, Alagappasamy Chellaiyahy.

Ah Meng was specially featured in the Singapore Guide book of 1988, The Singapore Treasury by Andreas and Carola Augustin.

== Death ==
Ah Meng died on 8 February 2008 due to old age. She was 47 years old, and was survived by two sons, Hsing Hsing (who died of diabetic complications at the Perth Zoo in 2017) and Satria, and three daughters, Medan, Hong Bao (named for the reddish hair orangutans have that shares the same colour as the red envelopes given to relatives during the Lunar New Year or weddings), and Sayang (darling), 12 grandchildren and 5 great-grandchildren.

On 10 February 2008, a memorial service for Ah Meng was held before a crowd of 4000 visitors at the Singapore Zoo.

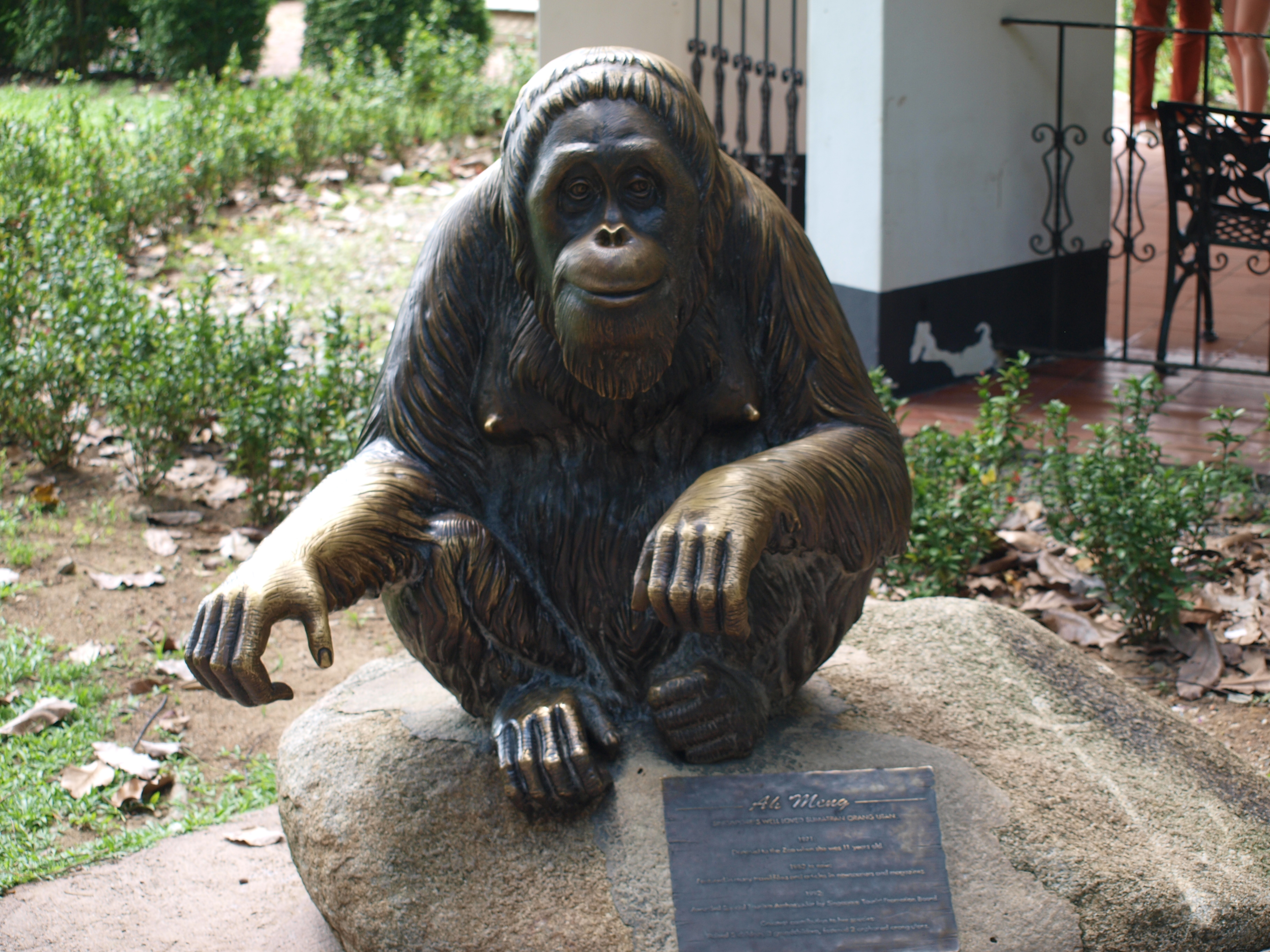
Statue of Ah Meng

As a tribute to her, the next orangutan born at the Singapore Zoo will be named Ah Meng Junior. A durian tree was planted at her grave because durian was her favourite fruit. A life-sized bronze statue forged in her image was also unveiled. Ishta, Ah Meng's granddaughter, Sayang and Galdikas' daughter, was chosen to take over the namesake of Ah Meng.

== See also ==
- Inuka, polar bear mascot of the Singapore Zoo
- List of individual apes
