= Singapore Zoo =

Zoo situated in Mandai, Singapore

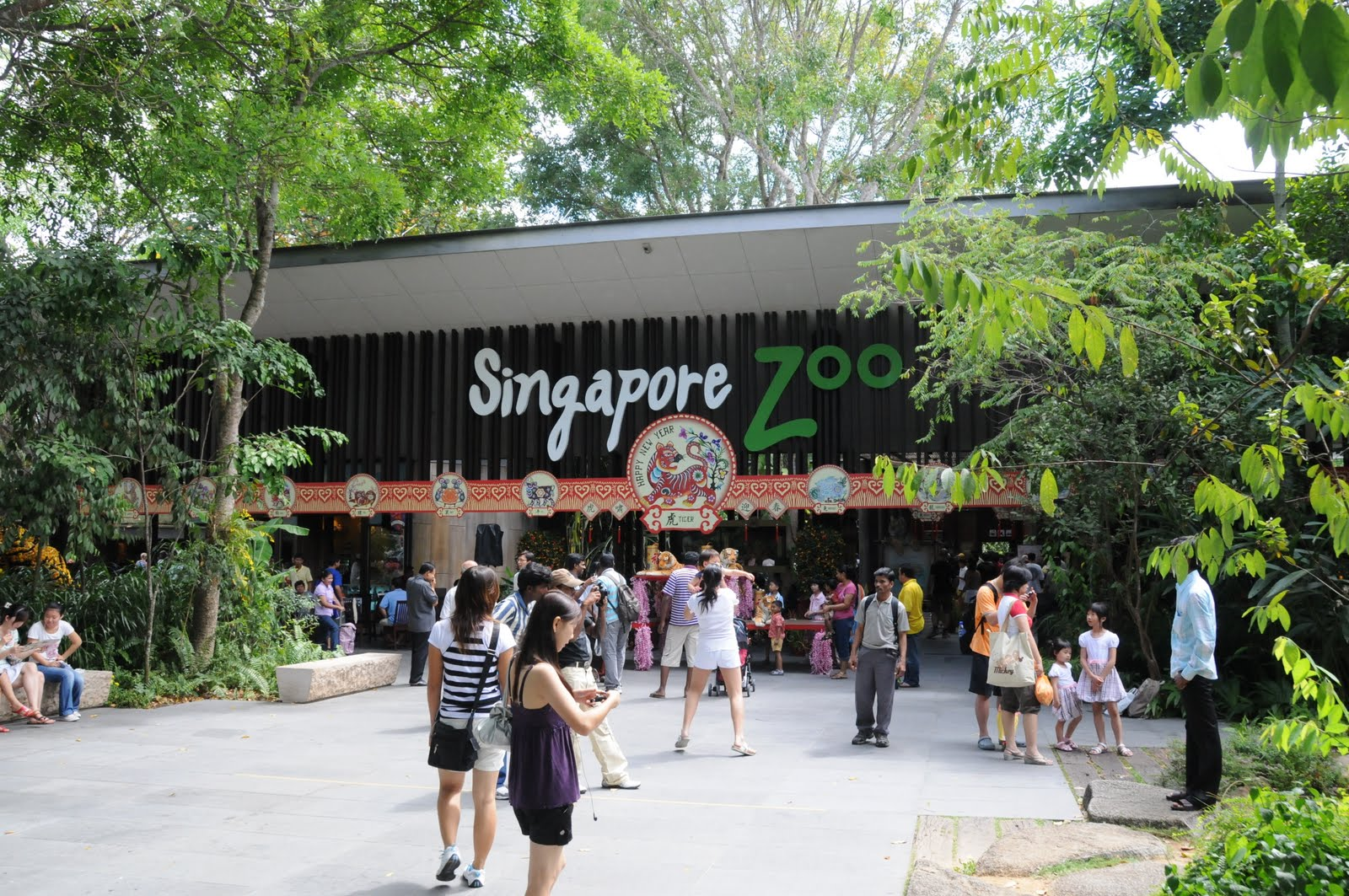
- Entrance of the Singapore Zoo, 2010
- Interactive map of Singapore Zoo
- 1°24′14″N 103°47′39″E
- Date opened: 27 June 1973; 53 years ago
- Location: Mandai, Singapore; 80 Mandai Lake Road, Singapore 729826
- Land area: 28 ha (69 acres)
- No. of animals: 2,530
- No. of species: 315
- Annual visitors: 2,132,270 (FY 2019/20)
- Public transit: 138 (Note: via TE4 Springleaf and NS16 CR11 Ang Mo Kio); 927 (Note: via NS4 JS1 BP1 Choa Chu Kang)
- Website: www.mandai.com/en/singapore-zoo.html

The Singapore Zoo, formerly known as the Singapore Zoological Gardens or Mandai Zoo, is a 28 hectares (69 acres) zoo located on the margins of Upper Seletar Reservoir within Singapore's heavily forested central catchment area. It is operated by the Mandai Wildlife Group, which also manages the neighbouring Night Safari, River Wonders, Bird Paradise as well as Rainforest Wild.

All five wildlife parks makes up the Mandai Wildlife Reserve, which cares for more than 15,000 animals from 1,000 species. Opened in 1973, the zoo was built at a cost of $9 million that was granted by the government of Singapore. Within the zoo, there are about 315 species of animals, of which some 16 percent are considered to be a threatened species. The zoo attracts about 2 million visitors every year.

Singapore Zoo exhibits animals in naturalistic, 'open' exhibits with hidden barriers, moats, and glass between the animals and visitors. It houses the largest captive colony of orangutans in the world. The Singapore Zoo has been highly ranked by various international metrics.

== History ==
Prior to the establishment of Singapore Zoo, there were other short-lived zoos in Singapore's history, including the first recorded zoo founded in the early 1870s at the present-day Singapore Botanic Gardens, a zoo opened in the 1920s in Ponggol (present-day Punggol) by animal trader William Lawrence Soma Basapa and two zoos run by two brothers by the surname of Chan during the 1960s.

The conception of the Singapore Zoo dates from 1969. At the time, the Public Utilities Board (PUBG) decided to use some of its land holdings around reservoirs for parks and open recreational facilities. The executive chairman of the PUB, Dr Ong Swee Law, set aside 88 ha (220 acres) of land for the construction of a zoological garden.

In 1970, consultants and staff were hired, and in 1971, the construction of the basic 50 enclosures was started. Animals were collected from dealers and donated by sponsors. The director of the National Zoological Gardens of Sri Lanka, Lyn de Alwis, was hired as a special consultant to work out the problems inherent in tropical zoos.

On 27 June 1973, the Singapore Zoo opened its gates for the first time with a collection of 270 animals from over 72 species, and a staff of 130. By 1990, 1,600 animals from more than 160 species lived in social groups, housed in 65 landscaped exhibits with boundaries conceived to look as natural as possible.

In 1987, the zoo began to display rare animals loaned by other zoos. The first animals displayed in this manner were the rare golden snub-nosed monkeys from China in 1987, which attracted more than half a million visitors. This was followed by white tigers from Cincinnati Zoo in 1988 and giant pandas from Wolong National Nature Reserve in 1990.

On 1 August 2000, Singapore Zoological Gardens, Jurong Bird Park and Night Safari were integrated under Wildlife Reserves Singapore, under the umbrella of Temasek Holdings. The zoo underwent a restructuring to improve its efficiency and branding which included the merging of shared services and expansion of consultancy services overseas. Night Safari, which began under the zoo, became a separate branding entity.

The restructuring of the zoo was not without controversy. Several key staff, including CEO Bernard Harrison, left as a result in 2002, citing differences in management style. In 2003, Wildlife Reserves Singapore launched a massive rebranding exercise, which was shelved due to widespread public disapproval. The name of the zoo was simplified to Singapore Zoo sometime by 2005.

As a result of the restructuring, more facilities were launched, such as a S$3.6 million Wildlife Healthcare & Research Centre in 2005. Existing infrastructure was revamped to further enhance the experience of visitors.

== Animals and exhibits ==
Treetops Trail

From a boardwalk, visitors can view yellow-cheeked gibbons, lar gibbons and overlook false gharials in the water. Additionally, cotton-top tamarins, ring-tailed lemurs and white-faced sakis are allowed to free-range within the area.

Tiger Trek

A pair of Malayan tigers, a male named Bongsu and female named Intan, reside in this enclosure. Their pair of white tigers, Keysa and Pasha, moved to Night Safari in 2024.

Gibbon Island

The opposite of Treetops Trail exhibit using landscaping, trees, and moats to create a more natural habitat like yellow-cheeked gibbons, great white pelicans, and red ruffed lemurs.

Orangutan Island

Orangutans have been a major attraction of the Singapore Zoo since its opening. The zoo houses both Bornean and Sumatran orangutans. A female Sumatran orangutan named Ah Meng became an icon for tourism, appearing in several tourism advertisements. She hosted the 'Breakfast with Orangutans' program, where visitors were allowed to take pictures and interact with her. Ah Meng died on 8 February 2008 of old age at 47 years old. Ishta, Ah Meng's granddaughter, was chosen to take over the namesake of Ah Meng.

Animal Breeding and Enrichment Centre

Formerly the Frozen Tundra section, this area now houses animals like African penguins, Asian water monitor, fennec fox and Dalmatian pelicans.

Wild Africa

This area houses the zoo's African savannah animals including southern white rhinos, Grévy's zebras, marabou storks, red river hogs, African painted dogs, cheetahs, nyalas, meerkats, African lions, and Rothschild's giraffes. Located past the lion exhibit are Sri Lankan leopards, a den for naked mole-rats and a fossa exhibit opened in 2019. In January 2026, three leopard cubs were born.

Reptile Kingdom

The outdoor portion of the zoo's reptile complex which has enclosures for the zoo's larger reptiles such as Aldabra giant tortoises, Komodo dragons, rhinoceros iguanas, African spurred tortoises, Siamese crocodiles and gharials which share their exhibit with Burmese roofed turtles.

RepTopia

Opening on 16 August 2017, RepTopia was a renovation of the 35-year-old Snake House. Several species of reptiles and amphibians are housed in four different regions—Deserts of the World, Indo-Pacific, Tropical Africa and Neotropical Rainforests; among them are big-headed turtles, blue-legged mantellas, blue-tongued skinks, Chinese crocodile lizards, crested geckos, crocodile monitors, D'Albertis pythons, electric blue geckos, emerald tree monitors, Gila monsters, golden poison frogs, king cobras, Moellendorff's trinket snakes, Philippine crocodiles, reticulated pythons, Roti Island snake-necked turtles, shingleback skinks, sidewinder rattlesnakes, tokay geckos, vine snakes, West African Gaboon vipers, western diamondback rattlesnakes, yellow-headed water monitors and yellow-spotted climbing toads. A behind-the-scenes facility is visible to the guests, allowing them to view the hatchery.

In January 2022, thirteen Roti Island snake-necked turtles were successfully repatriated to a breeding facility in Kupang.

Tortoise Shell-ter

Formerly the Critters Longhouse, which housed small mammals, this building was transformed into the Tortoise Shell-ter in 2016, housing different species of tortoises such as Burmese star tortoises, leopard tortoises, ploughshare tortoises and radiated tortoises in seven enclosures. Each habitat is climate-controlled with special lighting, heating and humidity control.

Fragile Forest

A 20,000 cubic meter biodome that houses a wide variety of tropical birds, mammals, reptiles, fish and invertebrates. Species kept in the biodome include black-casqued hornbills, green iguanas, lesser mouse-deer, Linne's two-toed sloths, Malayan flying foxes, Malayan peacock-pheasants, Nicobar pigeons, pied imperial pigeons, Prevost's squirrels, red-sided eclectus parrots, ring-tailed lemurs, spotted whistling ducks, western crowned pigeons, white-faced sakis and zebra doves with golden lion tamarins housed in a small enclosure near the biodome. The area also has a butterfly house consisting of 11 butterfly species, 8 of which are native to Singapore.

The Great Rift Valley of Ethiopia

Visitors first walk through a Konso and Amharic village with several waga sculptures dotted around. A large troop of hamadryas baboons are mixed with a few Nubian ibexes in an enclosure recreating the rugged steppes of Ethiopia. Another mob of meerkats, servals and rock hyraxes are kept in side enclosures.

Australasia

This zone features a walkthrough habitat with eastern grey kangaroos and magpie geese along with a southern cassowary enclosure at the end of the zone. Goodfellow's tree-kangaroos are housed indoors but are able to access an outdoor enclosure. The zoo's male tree-kangaroo named Makaia was born in 2014 at Adelaide Zoo and orphaned at five weeks old when his mother, Kia, was crushed by a falling tree branch. He made headlines after he was adopted by a yellow-footed rock wallaby. Makaia arrived at the Singapore Zoo in 2016 to accompany the zoo's female tree-kangaroo, Nupela. On 4 February 2020, Nupela gave birth to a male joey.

Four female koalas named Paddle, Chan, Pellita and Idalia were on loan to the zoo from the Lone Pine Koala Sanctuary to celebrate Singapore's golden jubilee in April 2015 and returned to Australia in February 2016.

Primate Kingdom

The Primate Kingdom consists of a large moat with several islands which house various monkeys and lemurs such as black-and-gold howler monkeys, black-and-white ruffed lemurs, De Brazza's monkeys, eastern black-and-white colobuses and some of the only red-shanked doucs in captivity.

Elephants of Asia

A herd of five female Asian elephants live in a 2.47 acre (1 ha) habitat with a large pool. Komali, the matriarch of the herd, is a Sri Lankan elephant, Gambir and Jati are Indian elephants and half-sisters Aprila and Intan are Sumatran elephants.

KidzWorld

Located at the very north of the zoo, KidzWorld is home to many domestic animals like goats, rabbits, horses, pigs, fancy chickens, fancy ducks, domestic turkeys and African spurred tortoises, among others. There are other attractions near this area as well, such as a carousel and a splash pad. Guests are allowed to closely interact with the animals and feed them.

Other animals

Other animals in the zoo include Asian small-clawed otters, bearded pigs, California sea lions, Celebes crested macaques, chimpanzees, Chinese alligators, emperor tamarins, North Sulawesi babirusas, proboscis monkeys, pygmy hippopotamus, red-capped mangabeys, sun bears and a West African dwarf crocodile.

== Education and conservation ==
The Wildlife Healthcare & Research Centre was opened in March 2006 as part of the zoo's efforts in wildlife conservation. The centre further underscores Singapore Zoo and Night Safari's commitment to conservation research, providing the infrastructure for the wildlife parks and overseas zoological partners to better execute their research programmes. The Singapore Zoo is the first zoo in the world to breed a polar bear in the tropics. Inuka was born on 26 December 1990, died 25 April 2018 (aged 27).

Animal activist and conservationist known as Steve Irwin admired the Singapore Zoo greatly, adopting it as the 'sister zoo' to Australia Zoo. He was at the Singapore Zoo in 2006 to officiate the opening of the Australian Outback exhibit.

== Presentations ==
=== Current Presentations ===
"Breakfast in the Wild" allows visitors to meet and interact closely with animals in the zoo, which has previously included Ah Meng (died on 8 February 2008) who was an icon of the Singapore tourism industry. Animal presentations, as well as token feedings coupled with live commentaries by keepers, are also the daily staple in Singapore Zoo.

The "Into The Wild" presentation in the Shaw Foundation Amphitheatre, which features many animals like hog badgers, ring-tailed lemurs, hornbills, and Indian crested porcupines, highlights how their special adaptations that help them survive in the wild, even when faced with various anthropogenic challenges like plastic waste, habitat destruction, or the wildlife trade.

The "Splash Safari" presentation features the zoo's sea lions performing acts relating to their natural behaviours, and also playing frisbee with a lucky visitor.

The "Animal Friends" presentation, housed in the Animal Buddies Theatre in the zoo's children's section, features mostly domesticated animals such as dogs and parrots performing tricks with the aim of teaching young children about pet responsibility.

=== Former Presentations ===
The "Rainforest Fights Back" presentation is housed in the Shaw Foundation Amphitheatre, the main amphitheater in the zoo. Actors and performers act alongside the animals: in-show, a villainous poacher attempts to mow down a section of tropical rainforest for land development, and is foiled by the native people and the animals of the rainforest—orangutans, lemurs, peacocks, otters, coatimumdis and ara parrots.

The "Elephants at Work and Play" presentation demonstrates how elephants are used as beasts of burden in south-east Asian countries. The animal caretakers are referred to as mahouts, and the show simulates how a mahout would instruct an elephant to transport logs or kneel so that they can be mounted. As of 2018, the show has been reworked as part of a shift in the care for the elephants to feature their natural behaviour instead of performing stunts.

== Organising events ==
There are three events venues in the zoo: Forest Lodge, Pavilion-By-the-Lake and Garden Pavilion. There are also three cocktail venues: Elephants of Asia, Tiger Trek and Treetops Trail. The Singapore Zoo also caters for birthday parties and weddings.

== Notable animals ==
- Inuka, the world's only tropical polar bear, and Singapore Zoo's last surviving polar bear (1990–2018)
- Ah Meng (orangutan), Singapore Zoo's world-famous Sumatran orangutan, and the World's Famous Orangutan (1960–2008)
- Omar (white tiger), Singapore Zoo's oldest white tiger (1999–2017)

== Incidents ==
On 7 March 1973, a black panther, Twiggy, escaped from the zoo before it had opened.

In early 1974, a hippopotamus named Congo escaped from the zoo and spent 47 days in the Seletar Reservoir.

Other escapes in 1974 included an eland and a tiger.

On 13 November 2008, three Bengal white tigers mauled a cleaner, 32-year-old Nordin Montong to death after he jumped into a moat surrounding their enclosure and taunted the animals.

== Awards ==
Awarded to Singapore Zoo:

- Bronze for Best Brand Engagement (Singapore Media Marketing Awards)—'Happy ZOObilee,' Singapore Zoo, 2023
- TripAdvisor Travelers' Choice, 2023
- Travellers' Choice Awards - Top 3 Zoos in the World, 2018
- Singapore Tourism Awards, 2017
- Traveller's Choice Awards - Zoos and Aquariums, 2017, 2015 and 2014
- Best Customer Service (Retail) Award, 2014
- Meritorious Defence Partner Award, 2013
- Singapore Experience Awards, 2013
- Singapore Service Award, 2013
- Singapore Service Excellence Medallion - Organisation, 2013
- Meritorious Defence Partner Award, 2012
- Most Popular Wildlife Park, Asian Attractions Awards, 2011
- Michelin 3-star rating, 2008
- Best Breakfast, 40 Jewels in ASEAN's Crown, 2007
- One of the World's Best Zoos, forbes-travel.com, 2007
- Bronze, Singapore H.E.A.L.T.H Awards, 2004
- Leisure Attraction of the Year, 6th, 7th, 8th, 13th, 16th, 17th, 20th and 22nd Singapore Tourism Board Awards
- Best New Attraction for the hamadryas baboons exhibit, ASEAN Tourism Association, 2002
- Cleanest Toilet, Ministry of Environment, 1997 and 1998

== Gallery ==
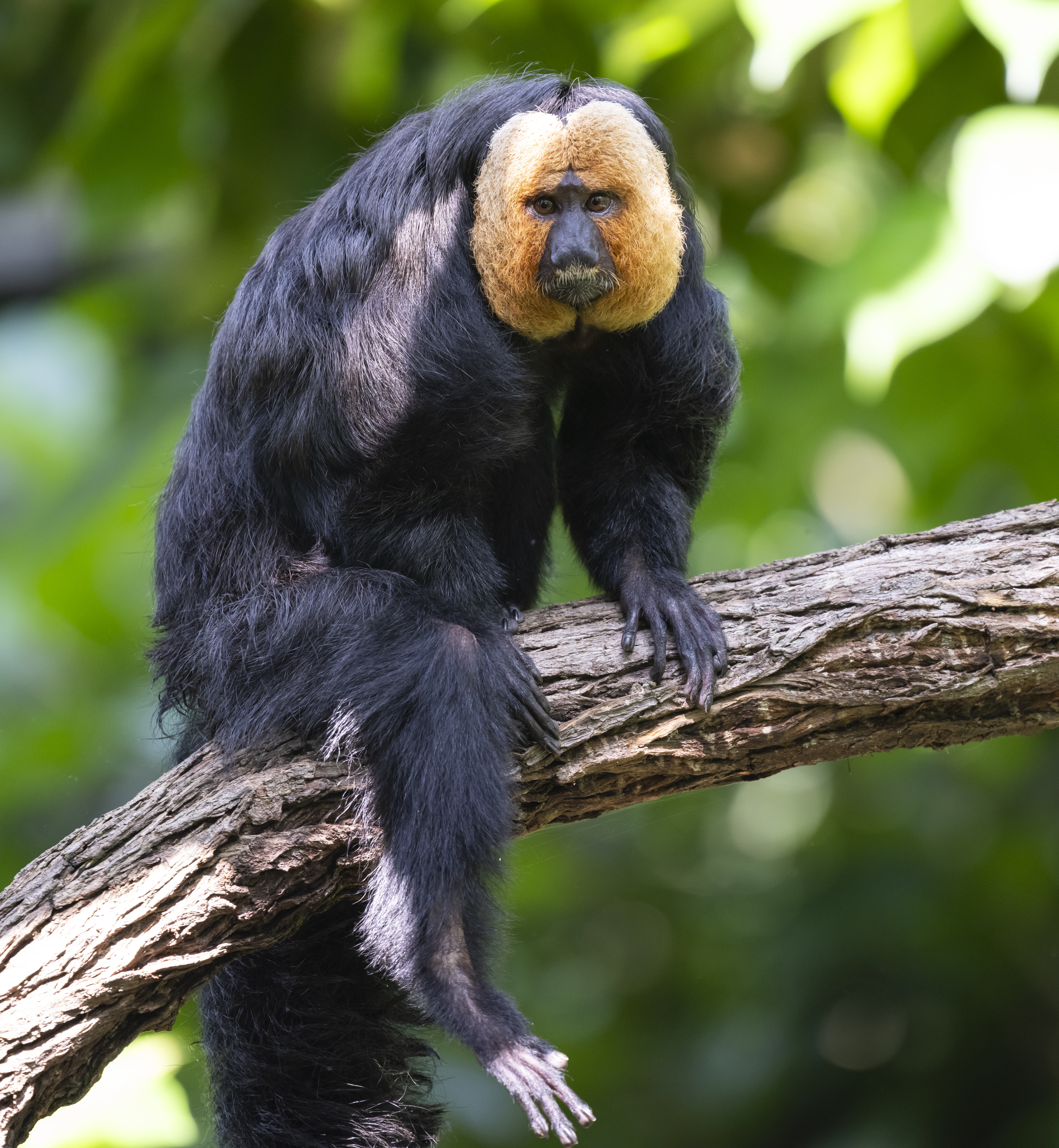
White-faced saki

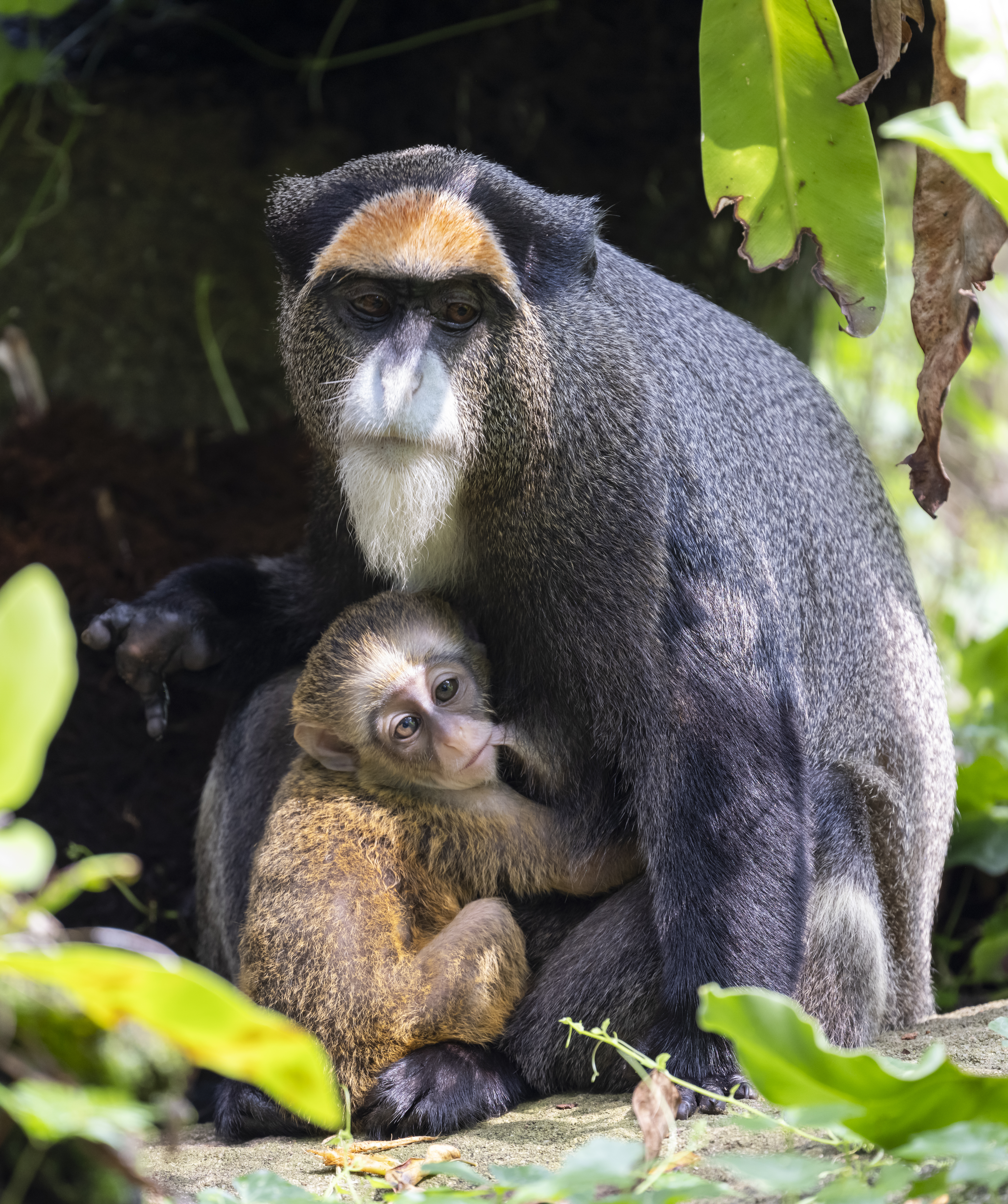
De Brazza's monkey

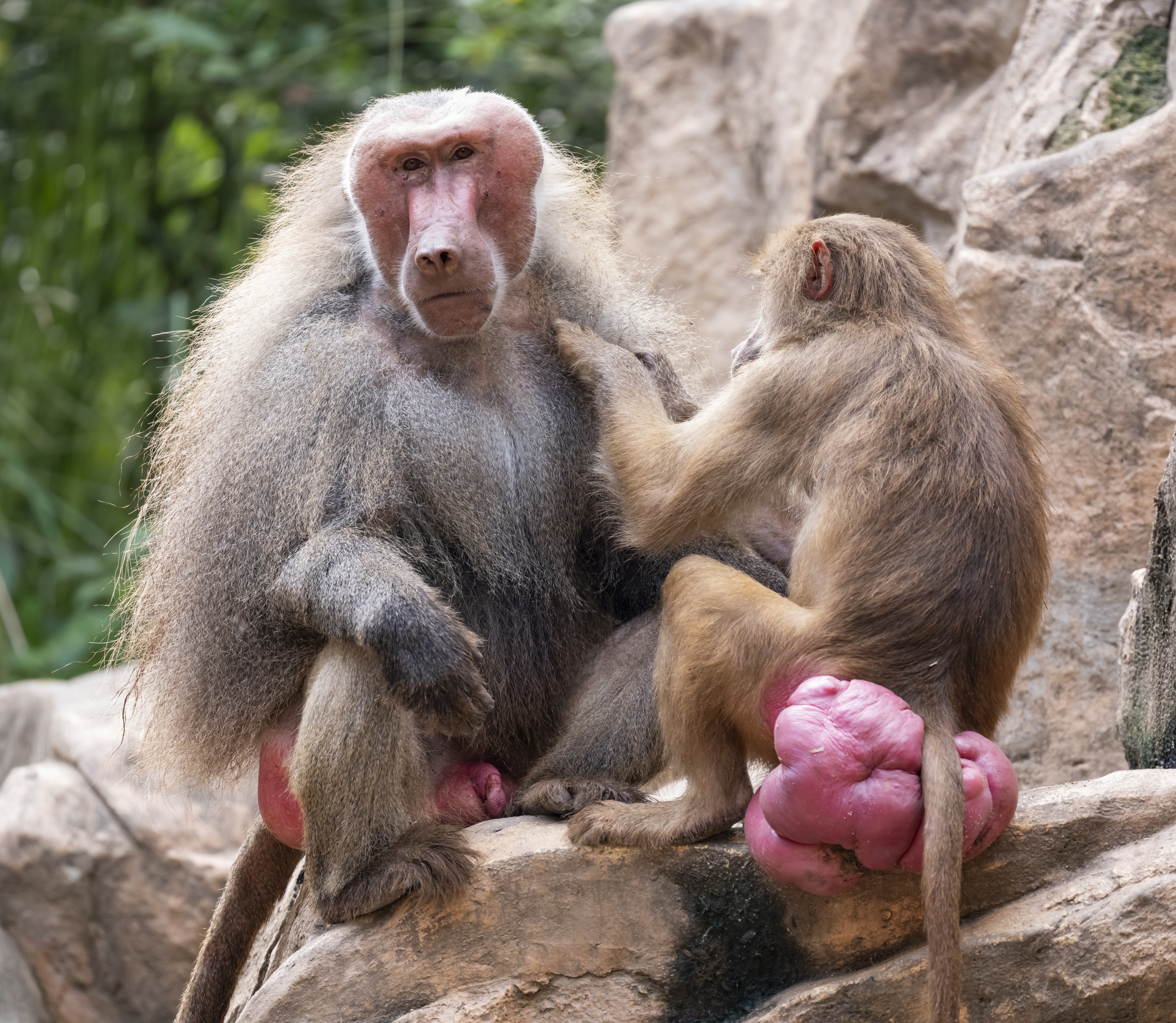
Hamadryas baboon

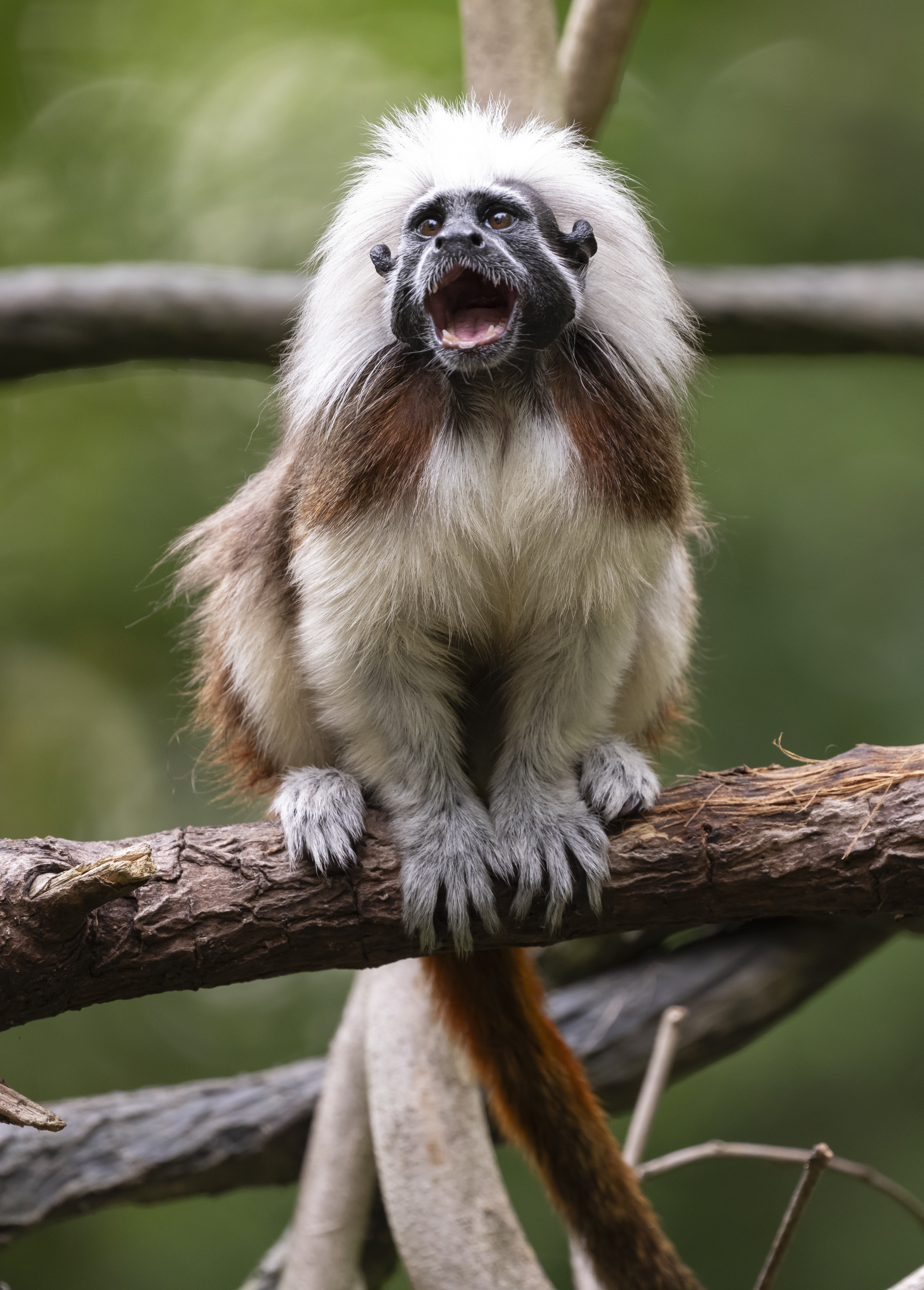
Cotton-top tamarin

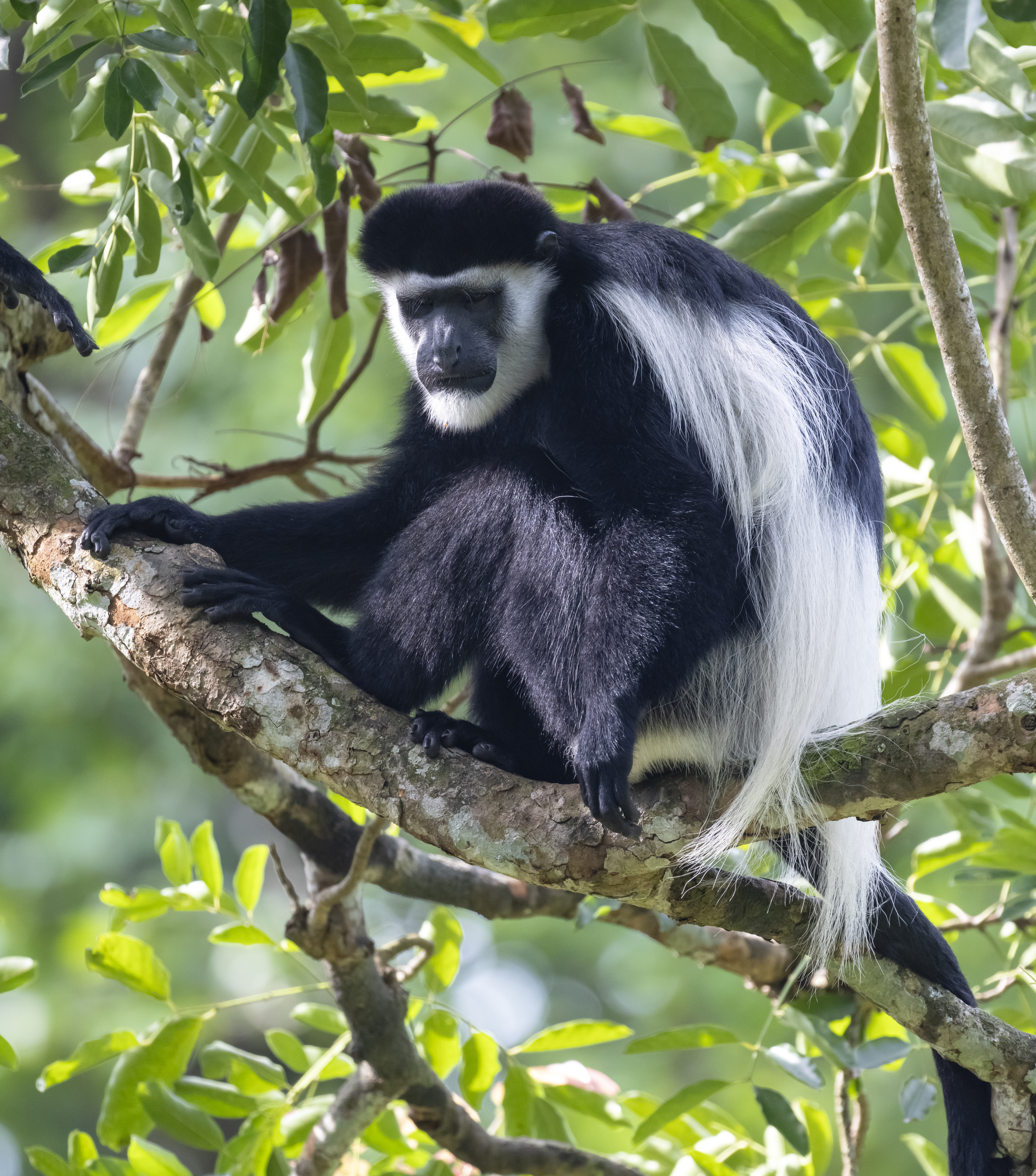
Eastern black-and-white colobus

Black-and-white ruffed lemur

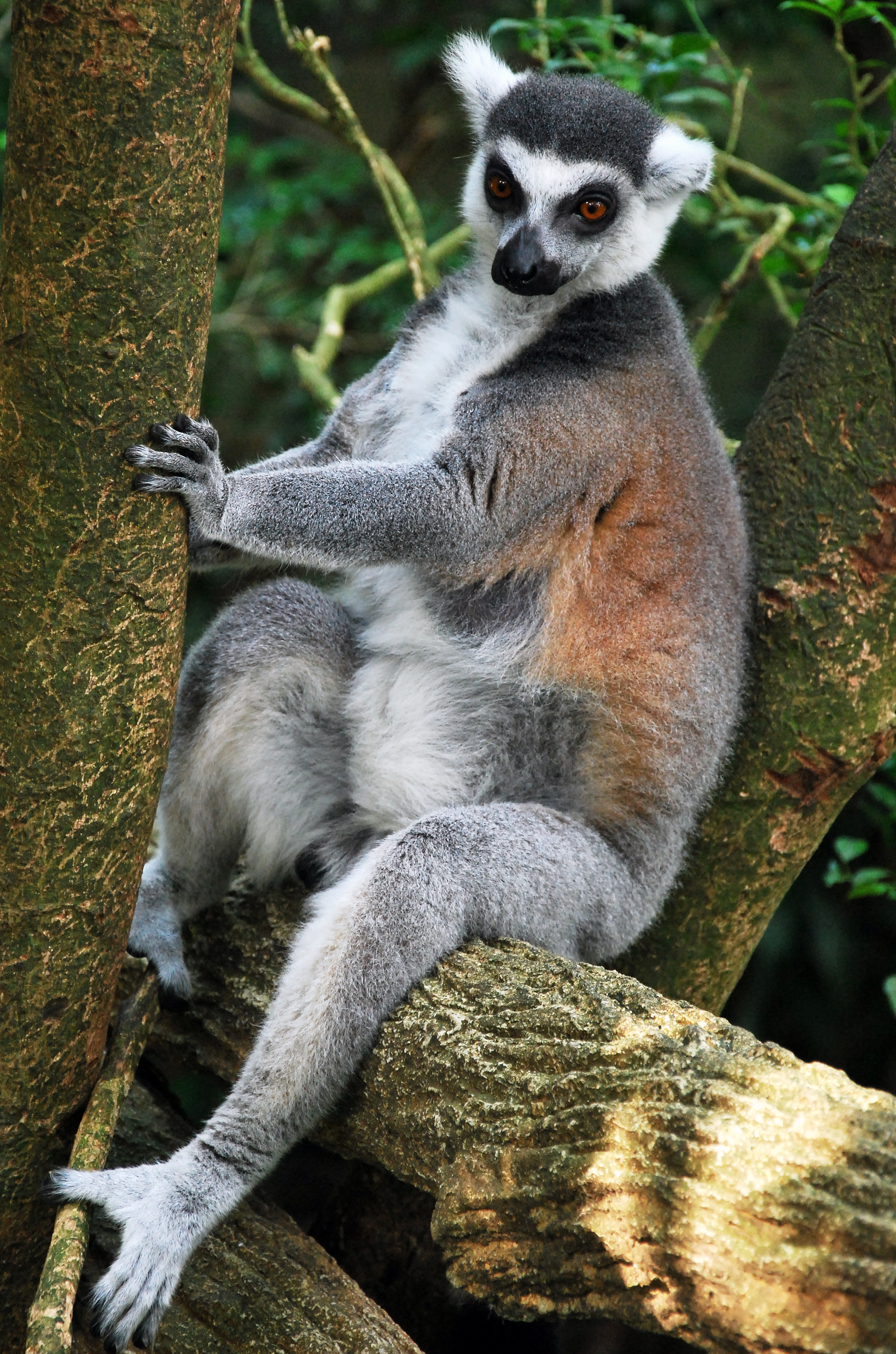
Ring-tailed lemur

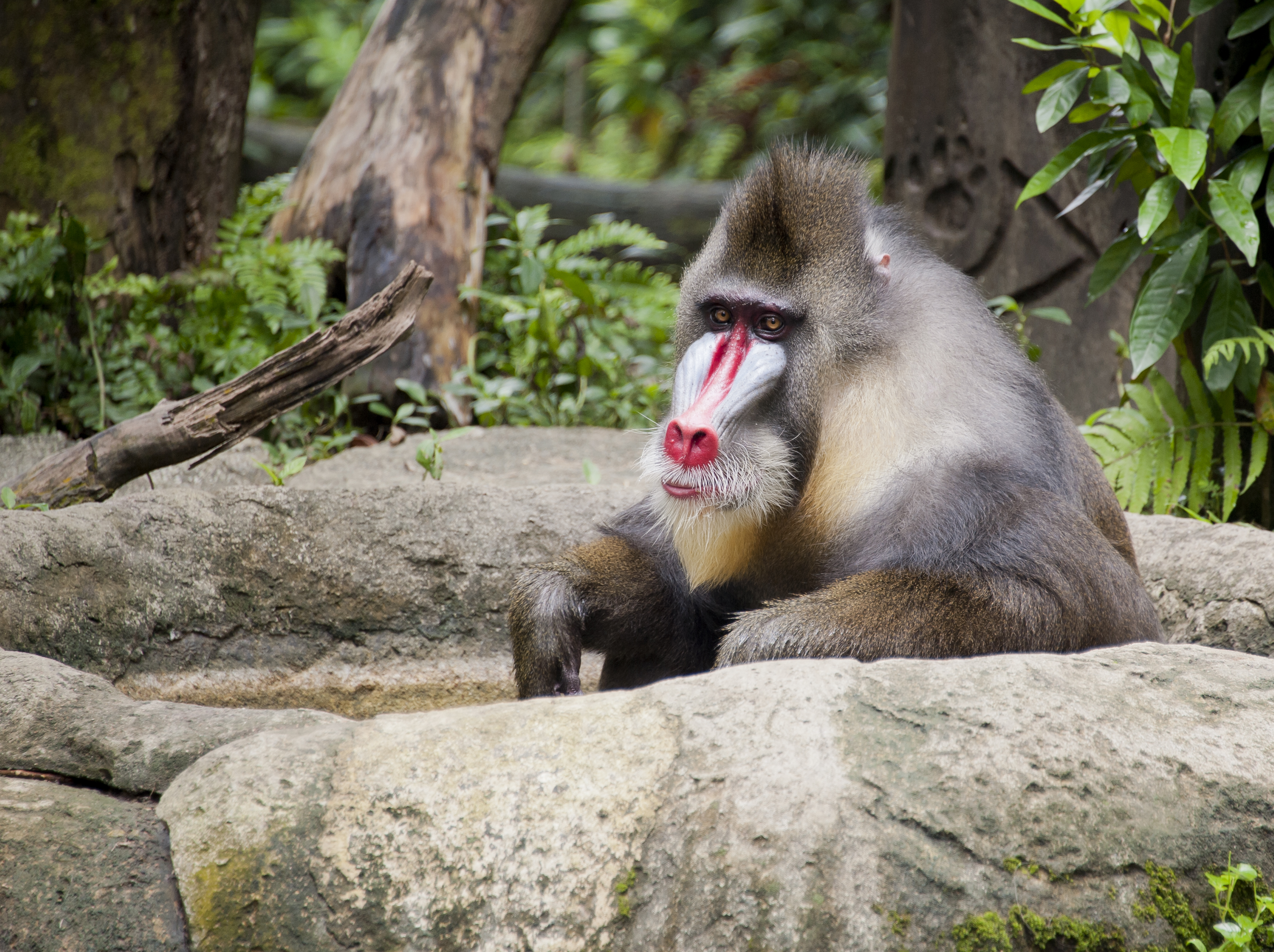
Mandrill

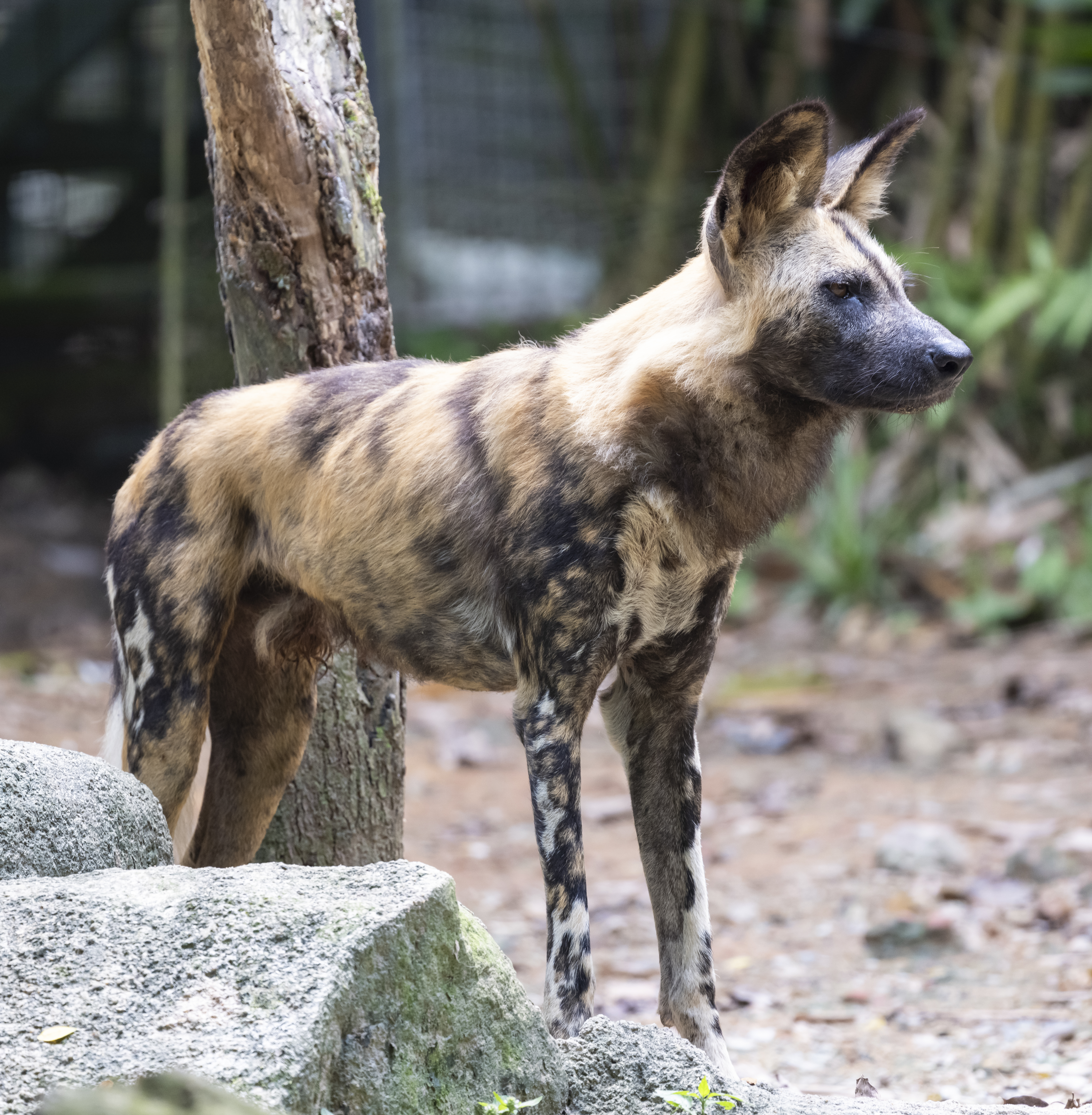
African wild dog

Nubian ibex

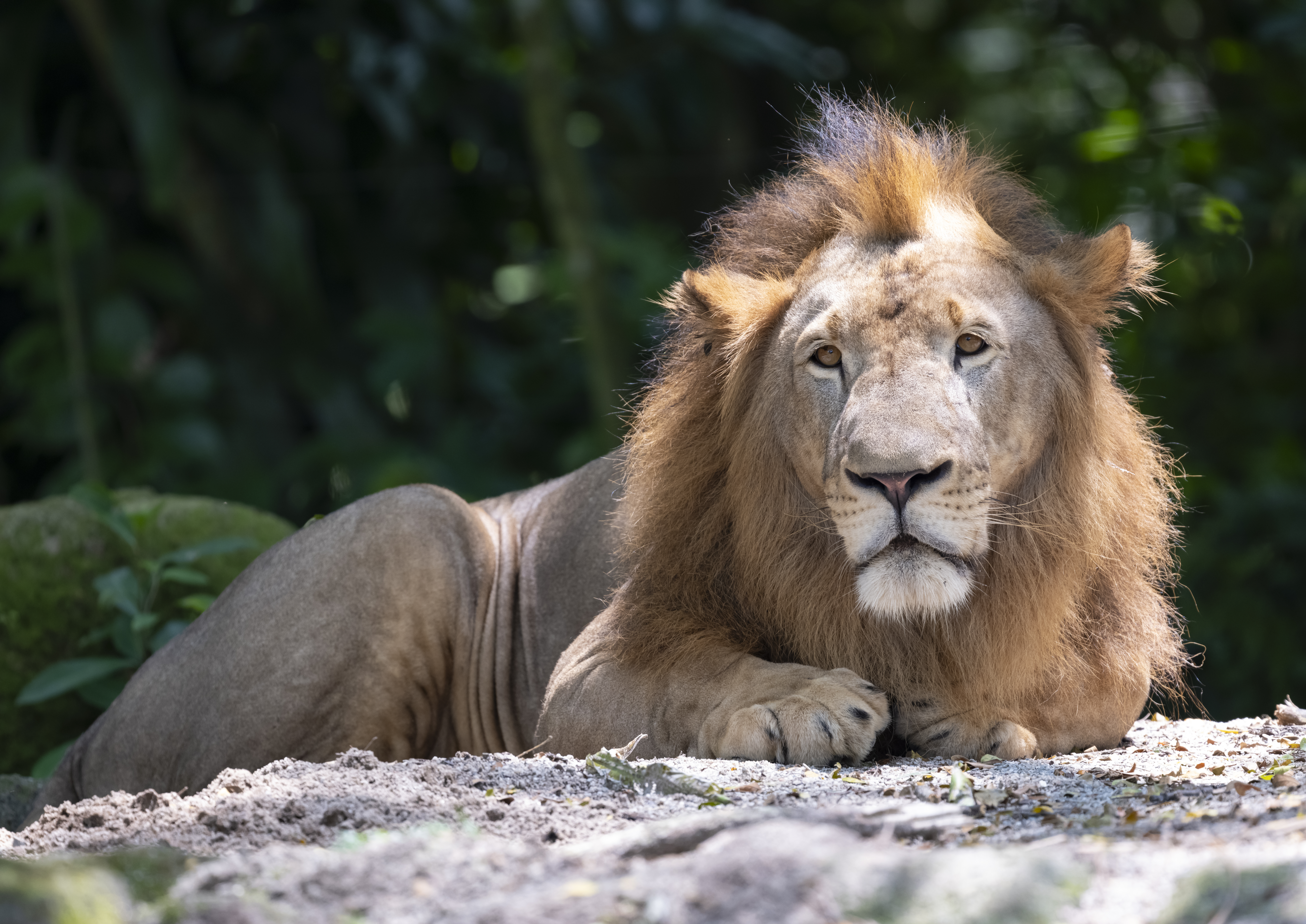
Lion

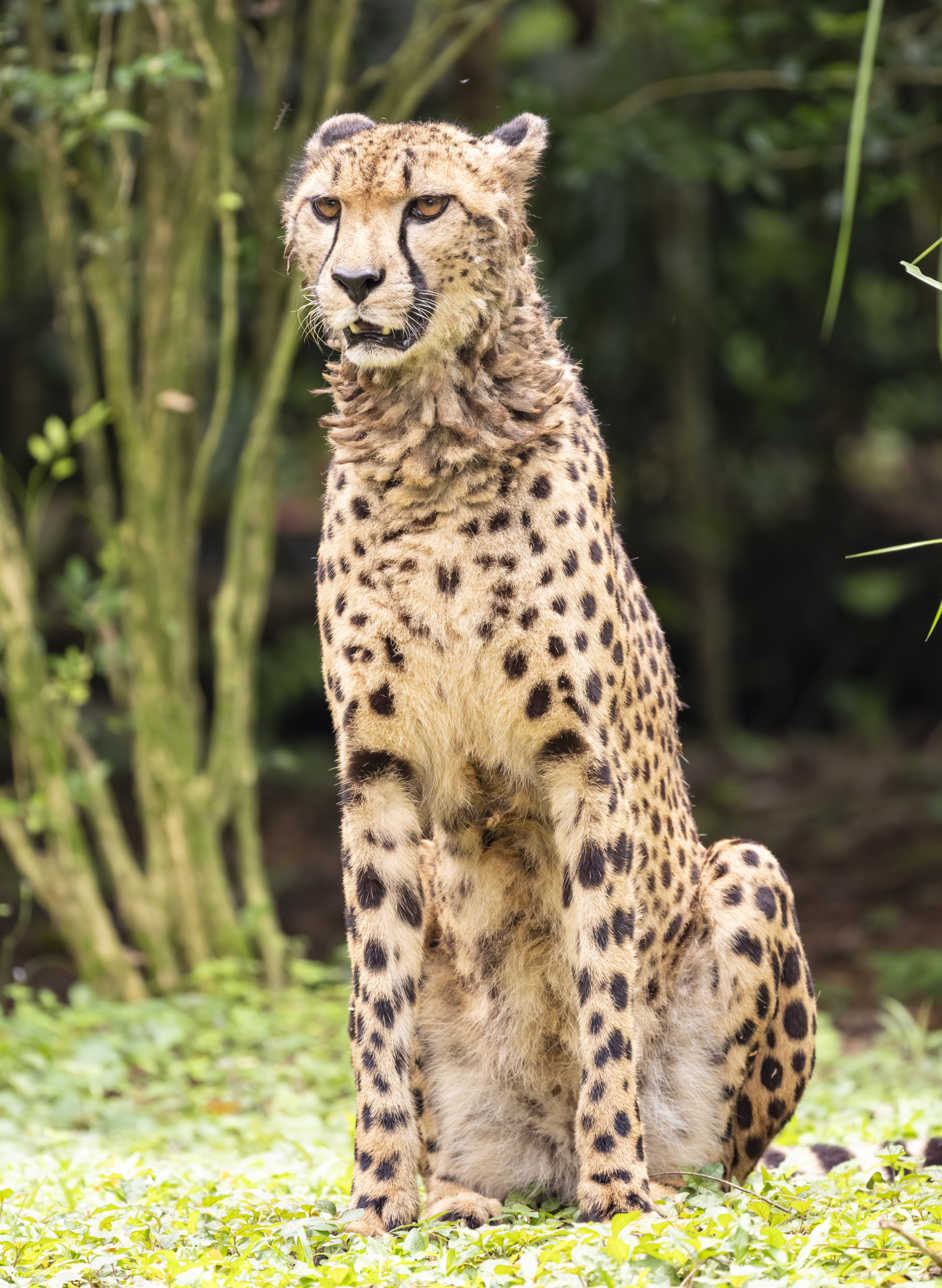
Cheetah

== Transportation ==
=== Public transportation ===
Two public bus services, 138 and 927, call at the bus stop near to the Zoo. 138 connects with the nearest MRT station at Springleaf MRT station as well as Ang Mo Kio MRT station, while 927 connects with Choa Chu Kang MRT station.

=== Bus ===
A shuttle service, known as the Mandai Khatib Bus, plies daily between Khatib MRT station and the Zoo. A one-way trip costs $2.50 for everyone above the age of three.

== Bibliography ==
- Véronique Sanson (1992). Gardens and Parks of Singapore. Oxford University Press. ISBN 0-19-588588-0
- Ilsa Sharp (1994). The First 21 Years: The Singapore Zoological Gardens Story. Singapore Zoological Gardens. ISBN 981-00-5674-5
