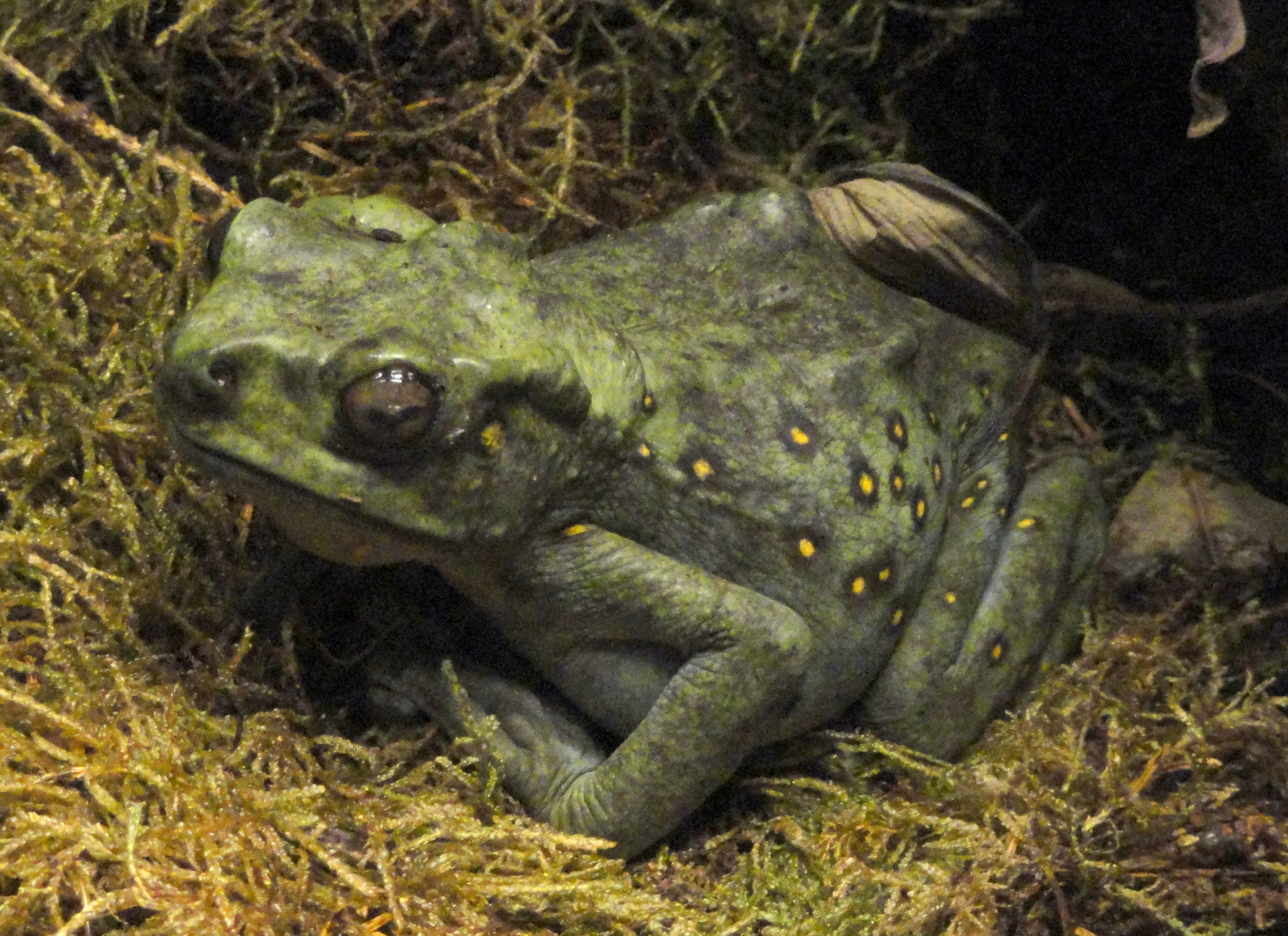

Conservation status
- Least Concern (IUCN 3.1)

Scientific classification
- Kingdom: Animalia
- Phylum: Chordata
- Class: Amphibia
- Order: Anura
- Family: Bufonidae
- Genus: Rentapia
- Species: R. hosii

Binomial name
- Rentapia hosii (Boulenger, 1892)

Synonyms
- Nectophryne hosii Boulenger, 1892; Pedostibes hosii (Boulenger, 1892); Pedostibes hosei (Boulenger, 1892)

= Rentapia hosii =

Species of amphibian

Rentapia hosii, also known as the Boulenger's Asian tree toad, common tree toad, tree toad, House's tree toad (sic), Malayan brown toad, brown tree toad, or Asian yellow-spotted climbing toad, is a species of toad in the family Bufonidae. It is found in the Malay Peninsula (including extreme southern peninsular Thailand), Borneo (Indonesia, Brunei, and Malaysia), and Sumatra (Indonesia).

Rentapia hosii is an arboreal toad found in forest and other dense vegetation along large lowland rivers, at elevations below 800 m (2,600 ft). It breeds in clear forest streams. After metamorphosis, juveniles disperse through the surrounding forest, gradually becoming arboreal.
