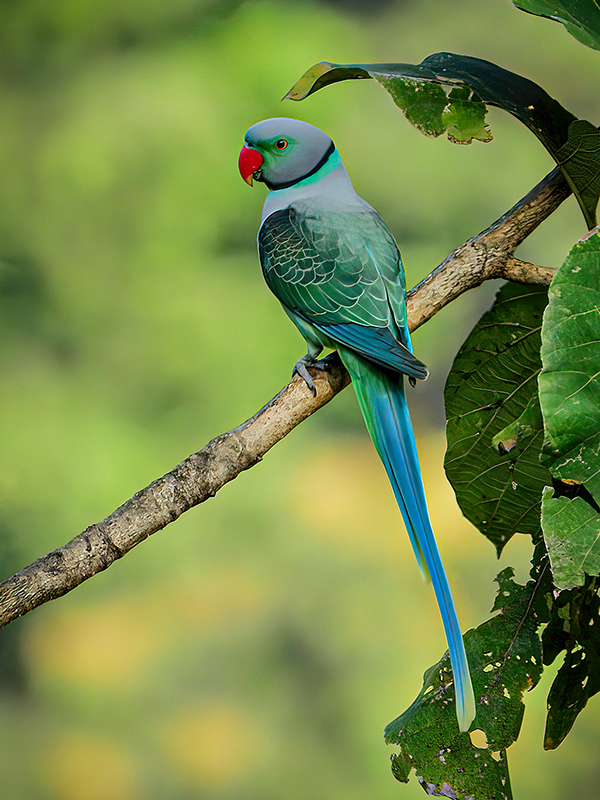
- Male in Mangaon, Raigad, Maharashtra

Conservation status
- Least Concern (IUCN 3.1)
- CITES Appendix II

Scientific classification
- Kingdom: Animalia
- Phylum: Chordata
- Class: Aves
- Order: Psittaciformes
- Family: Psittaculidae
- Genus: Psittacula
- Species: P. columboides

Binomial name
- Psittacula columboides (Vigors, 1830)

= Blue-winged parakeet =

Species of bird

The blue-winged parakeet (Psittacula columboides), also known as the Malabar parakeet, is a species of parakeet endemic to the Western Ghats of southern India. Found in small flocks, they fly rapidly in forest clearings while making screeching calls that differ from those of other parakeet species within their distribution range. Their long blue tails tipped in yellow and the dark wings with blue contrast with the dull grey of their head and body. Adult males and females can be easily told apart from the colour of their beak.

== Description ==
The blue-winged parakeet is bluish grey with a long yellow-tipped tail. The black neck ring is complete in both males and females. The male has a bluish-green lower edge to the black collar and the upper mandible is red with a white tip while the female has an all black bill and has only the black collar. The female looks similar to the female of the plum-headed parakeet which however can be told apart by its broad yellow collar. Flocks move through the forest while calling out in a series of screeching keek-keek-keek calls.

They breed in the dry season after the northeast Monsoon and the chicks fledge before the southwest Monsoon in June. They nest in holes in trees (often tall Mesua ferrea species), especially old woodpecker and barbet nests. The birds begin breeding in December and eggs are laid in December and January. The usual clutch was 4 eggs which hatch after about 23 days. The female initially broods with the male bringing food and later the male takes over. The chicks fledge in about a month and leave the nest. Chicks are sometimes trapped for trade. Individuals have been observed feeding on the leaves of Loranthus longiflorus.

The closest living relative of this species is Layard's parakeet which is endemic to Sri Lanka.

== Distribution ==
This parakeet is restricted to the Western Ghats south of about 19°N (Kasa, north of Bombay) to Kerala, extending into the hills of the Palnis and Nilgiris as well as the adjoining Eastern Ghats including the Biligirirangan range and possibly further east in the Kolli Hills in India.

== In culture ==
This species is sometimes traded although now illegal within India. It was known in the pet trade as the "Bababudan Parrot" and acquired a misleading reputation as a superior talker.
