= Seychelles parrot =

There are two species of bird alternatively called the Seychelles parrot:

- Seychelles parakeet, Psittacula wardi
- Seychelles black parrot, Coracopsis barklyi
