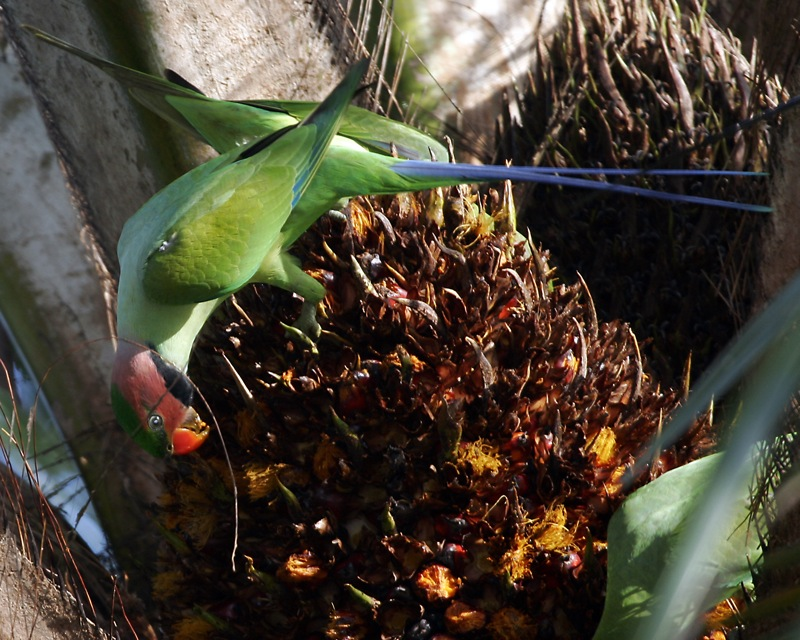
- Pair feeding in Queenstown, Singapore (the male is in the foreground)

Conservation status
- Vulnerable (IUCN 3.1)
- CITES Appendix II

Scientific classification
- Kingdom: Animalia
- Phylum: Chordata
- Class: Aves
- Order: Psittaciformes
- Family: Psittaculidae
- Genus: Psittacula
- Species: P. longicauda

Binomial name
- Psittacula longicauda (Boddaert, 1783)

Synonyms
- Belocercus longicaudus

= Long-tailed parakeet =

Species of bird

The long-tailed parakeet (Psittacula longicauda) or Burung Bayan Nuri in Malay is a parakeet endemic to the regions of Andaman and Nicobar Islands, Sumatra, Borneo and Peninsular Malaysia (including Singapore). It is allopatric with the congener, the Red-breasted parakeet, Psittacula alexandri, except in the Andaman Islands where they occur together.

== Taxonomy ==
The long-tailed parakeet was described by the French polymath Georges-Louis Leclerc, Comte de Buffon in 1780 in his Histoire Naturelle des Oiseaux. The bird was also illustrated in a hand-coloured plate engraved by François-Nicolas Martinet in the Planches Enluminées D'Histoire Naturelle which was produced under the supervision of Edme-Louis Daubenton to accompany Buffon's text. Neither the plate caption nor Buffon's description included a scientific name but in 1783 the Dutch naturalist Pieter Boddaert coined the binomial name Psittacus longicauda in his catalogue of the Planches Enluminées. The type locality is Malacca on the southern region of the Malay Peninsula. The long-tailed parakeet is now placed in the genus Psittacula that was introduced by the French naturalist Georges Cuvier in 1800. The name of the genus is a diminutive of the Latin word psittacus for a "parrot". The specific epithet longicauda combines the Latin longus meaning "long" and cauda meaning "tail".

Five subspecies are currently recognized:

- P. l. tytleri (Hume, 1874) – Andaman long-tailed parakeet – Andaman and Coco Islands
- P. l. nicobarica (Gould, 1857) – Nicobar long-tailed parakeet – Nicobar Islands
- P. l. modesta (Fraser, 1845) – Enggano long-tailed parakeet – Enggano Island
- P. l. longicauda (Boddaert, 1783) – common long-tailed parakeet – south Malay Peninsula, Singapore, Sumatra, Nias, Bangka Island Anambas Islands, Borneo
- P. l. defontainei Chasen, 1935 – Natuna Islands

== Description ==
It is mainly green with a long blue tail. The male has a black cap and red cheek or face. The female lacks the black cap and has less red cheek.

== Habitat ==
The long-tailed parakeet is able to live in a wide variety of habitats such as in swamp forests, lowland evergreen forest, oil palm plantations, coconut plantations, gardens, public parks, and is a frequent visitor to agricultural areas (especially those who yield tropical fruits and seeds). It is usually seen in elevations of up to 300 metres (980 ft).

== Ecology and behavior ==
The long-tailed parakeet is an extremely social bird, always seen communicating with other birds of its species. Even though small groups are usually seen, flocks of thousands of birds have been in the Andaman Islands and Borneo. However, the large flocks tend to appear during breeding season. It is a colony breeder. Birds on the Malay Peninsula tend to breed from December to February while birds on the Nicobar and Andaman Islands tend to breed from February to March. Females tend to lay a clutch of 2 to 4 eggs approximately 30.5 x 24.5mm. It usually takes about 23 to 24 days for the eggs to hatch. Chicks fledge at around 7 weeks old. Its diet consists of a variety of berries, papaya, areca nuts, a wide variety of cultivated and wild fruit (Dillenia indica and Sonneratia alba, as well as Dryobalanops, Elaeis, and Pandanus spp.), flowers (Acacia and Bombax spp.), seeds (Dipterocarpus crinitus and Vitex pinnata, as well as Ixonanthes, Lagerstroemia, and Macaranga spp.), and cultivated grains such as corn and rice. It is a curious species, as it is often seen playing with sticks or other materials found in its environment. This bird species tend to find a breeding area or nest in a high tree trunk almost same behavioral as the Psittacidae family.

== Threats ==
Much of the long-tailed parakeet's natural habitat is threatened by deforestation and illegal logging. Capture for the illegal pet trade is also a threat to the survival of this species.

== Gallery ==
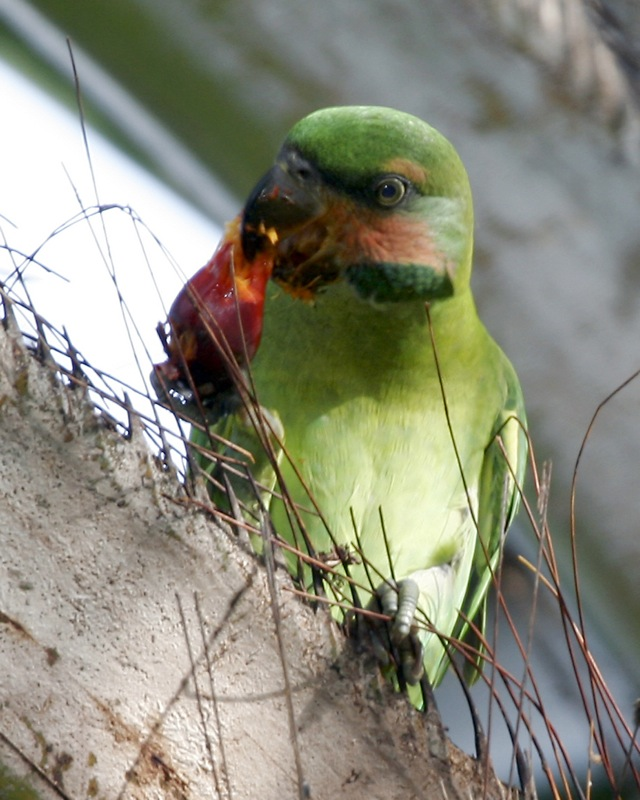
Female

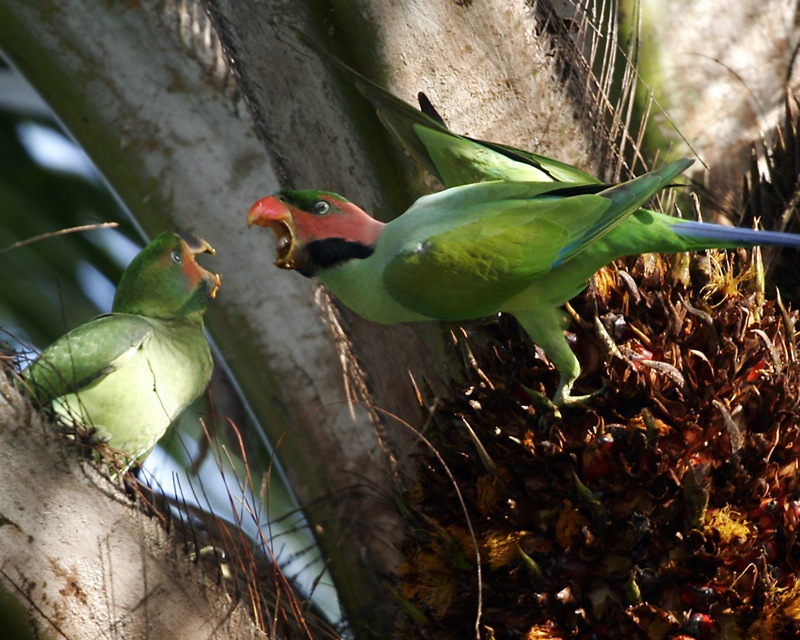
Squabbing over food (male on right)
