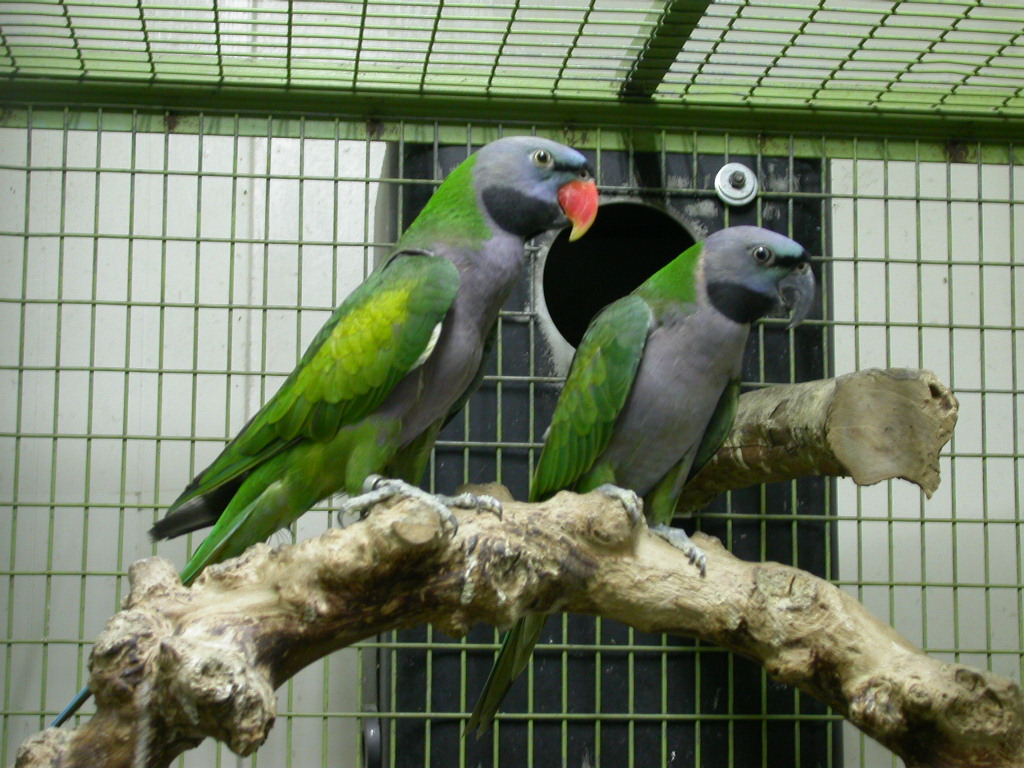
- A pair - male on left and female on right

Conservation status
- Near Threatened (IUCN 3.1)
- CITES Appendix I

Scientific classification
- Kingdom: Animalia
- Phylum: Chordata
- Class: Aves
- Order: Psittaciformes
- Family: Psittaculidae
- Genus: Psittacula
- Species: P. derbiana

Binomial name
- Psittacula derbiana (Fraser, 1852)

= Lord Derby's parakeet =

Species of bird

Lord Derby's parakeet (Psittacula derbiana), also known as Derbyan parakeet, is a parrot species, which is confined to a small pocket of moist evergreen forest in the hills and mountains of the Indian states of Arunachal Pradesh and Assam, and adjoining parts of Tibet, Sichuan and Yunnan in China. The species suffers from cutting of old trees (important for nesting sites) and poaching for the illegal wildlife trade. In 2011, its status was updated from least concern to near threatened on the IUCN Red List. The adult male and female are easily distinguished because they have different beak colours and slightly different plumage.

The name of this bird commemorates Edward Stanley, 13th Earl of Derby.

Lord Derby's parakeets feed on fruits, berries, seeds, and leaf buds, occasionally foraging in gardens and fields.

== Description ==
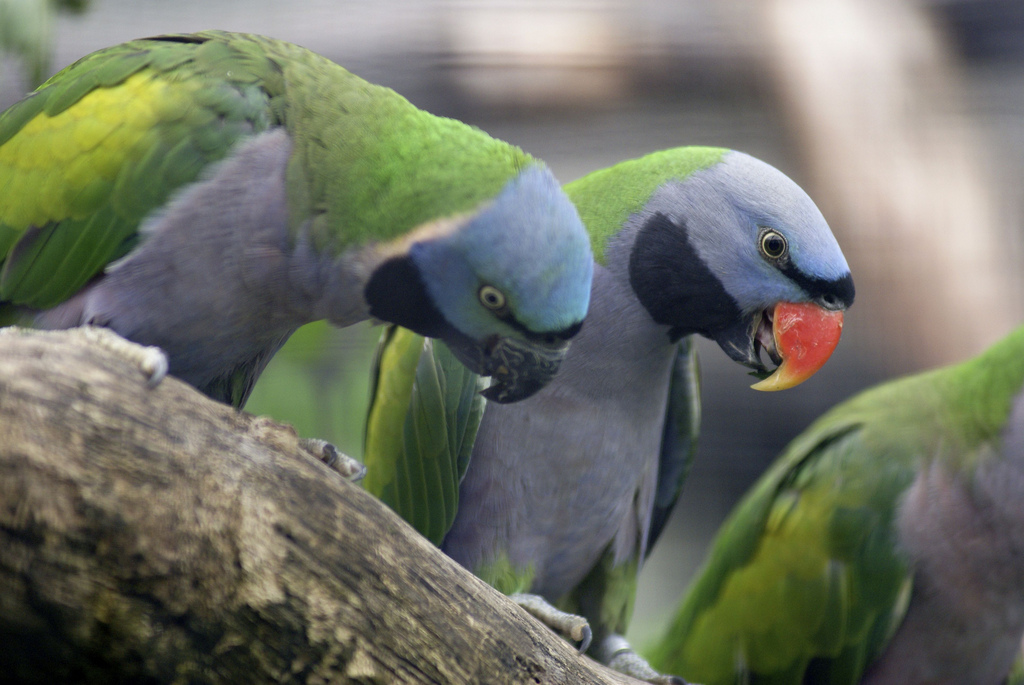
A pair at Wilhelma Zoo, Germany

Lord Derby's parakeets are 45–50 cm (18–20 in) in length and are sexually dimorphic. They have a mostly green plumage over their dorsal surface (i.e. from behind), black lores and lower cheeks, a bluish-purple crown and pale yellow eyes. The throat, breast, abdomen and under-wing coverts are greyish blue to lavender. The thighs and vent area are yellowish green with blue edging on some of the feathers. The tail feathers are shades of green, some edged with blue. Male birds have a red upper mandible with a yellow tip, while the lower mandible is black. The females have an all-black beak.

Immature Lord Derby's parakeets are duller in colour than the adults. Juvenile birds have green crowns, orange-red upper and lower mandible (beak), and their irises are dark and do not lighten until they reach maturity between two and three years of age.

=== Sexual dimorphism ===
Adult male

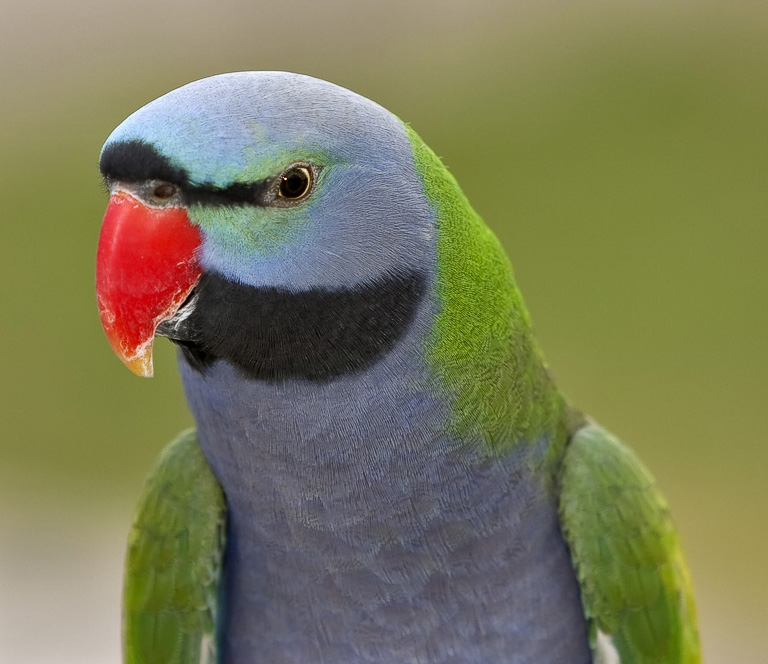
The adult male has a red upper mandible

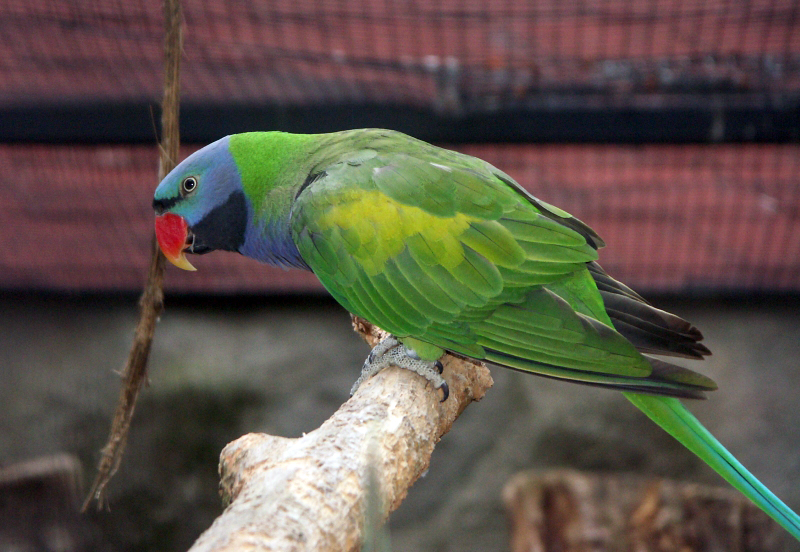
Male

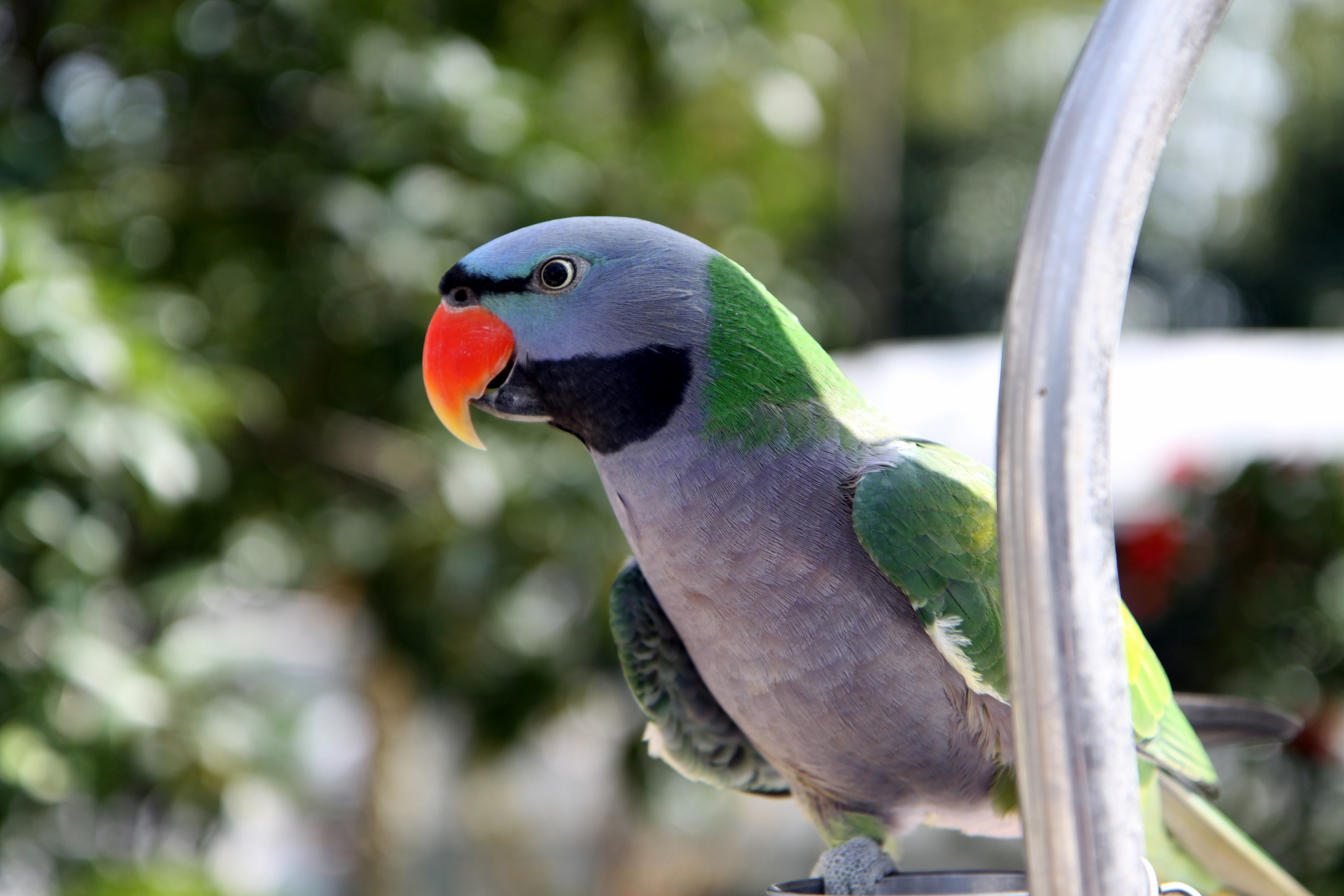
Male pet kept in China
Adult female

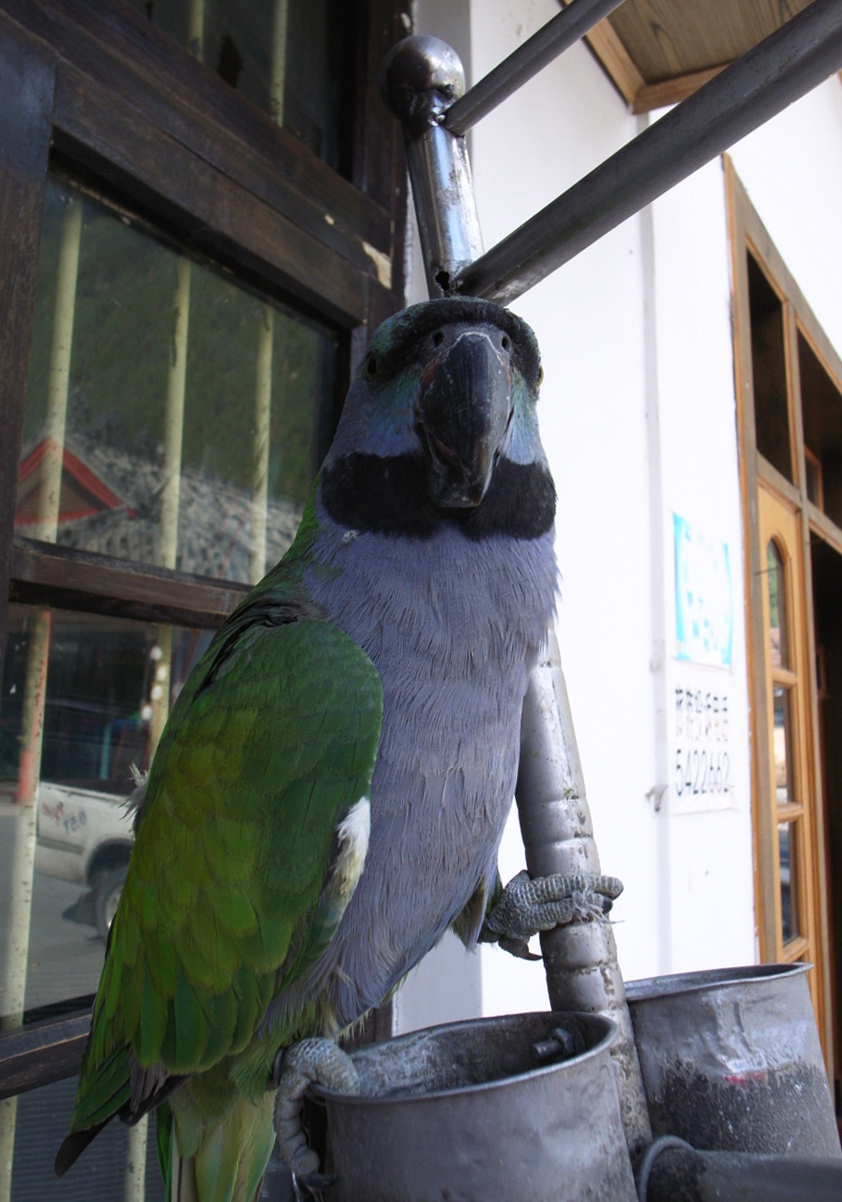
A female pet in Tibet. The adult female has an all black beak.

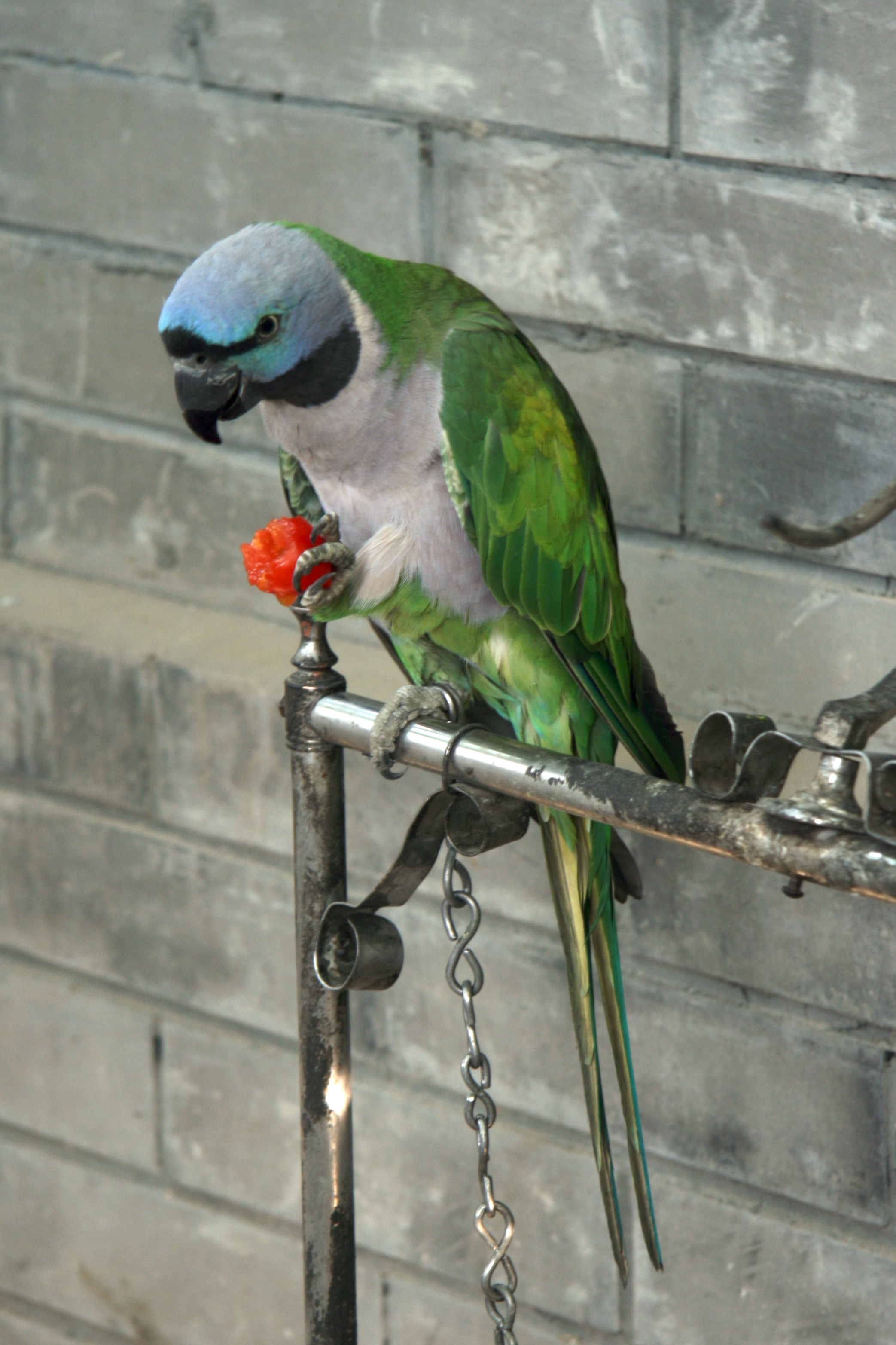
A female pet in China

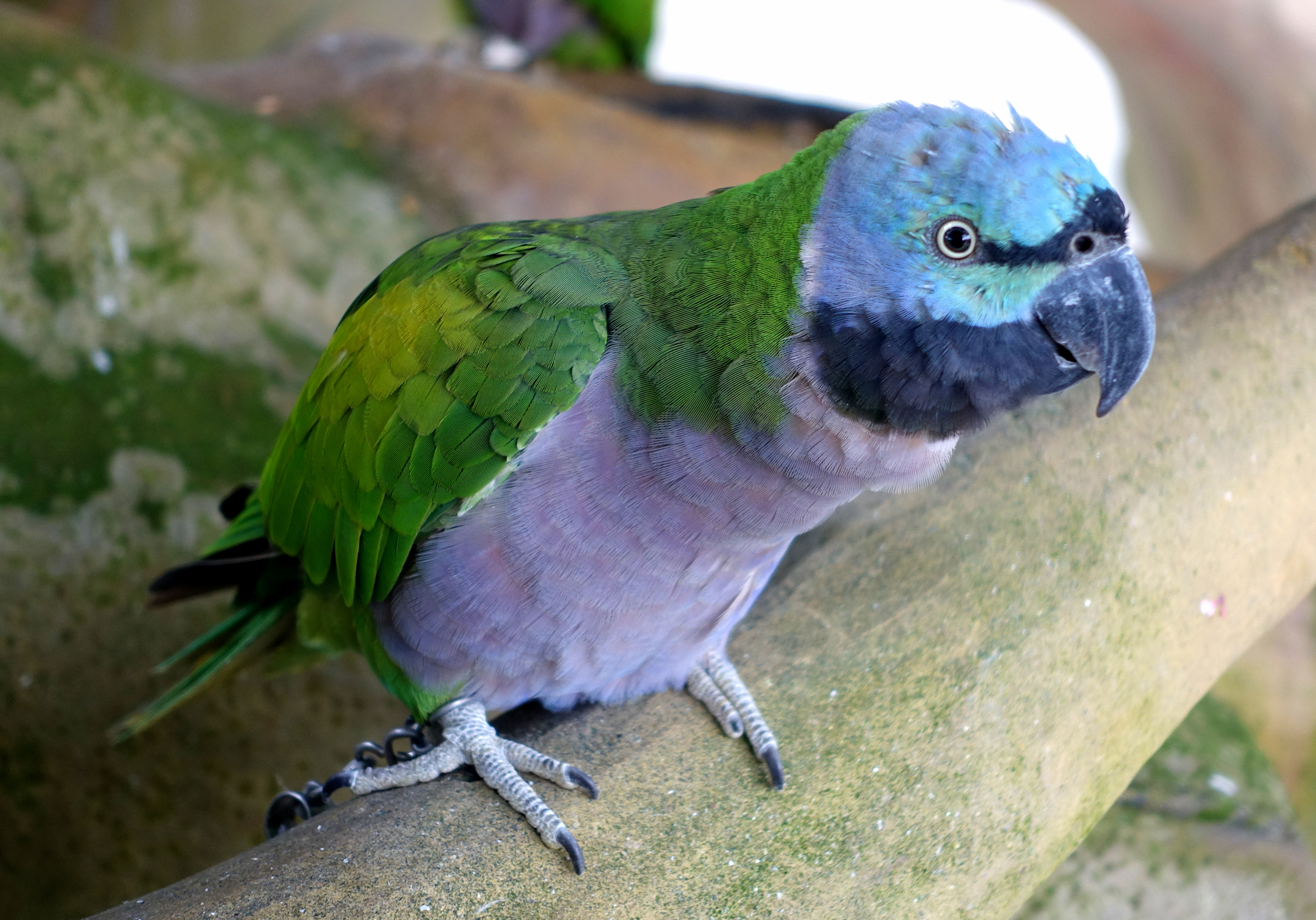
A captive female in China

== Reproduction ==
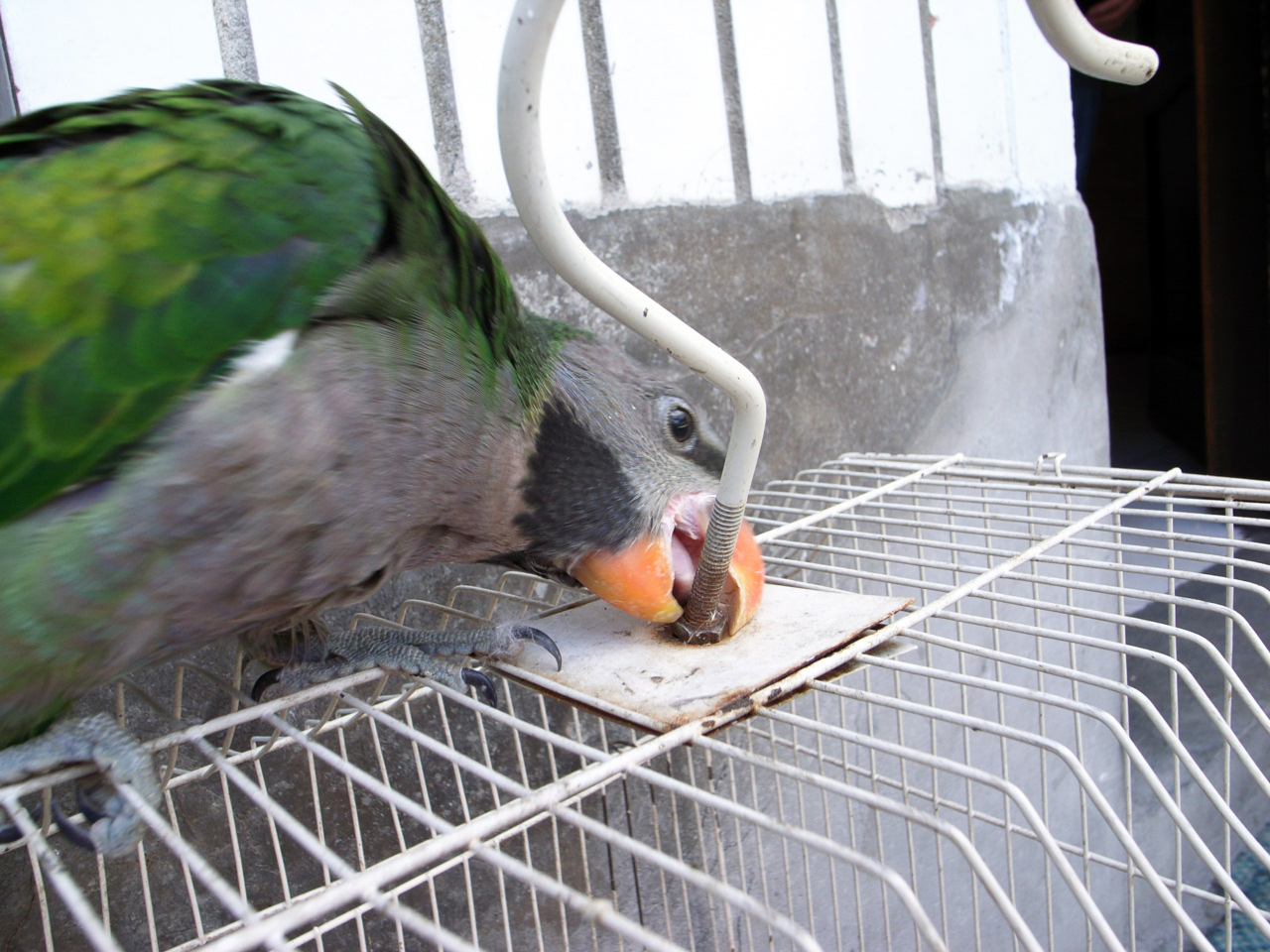
Juvenile playing with a bolt on a cage in Tibet. Juveniles have dark irises and both the upper and lower mandible are orange-red.

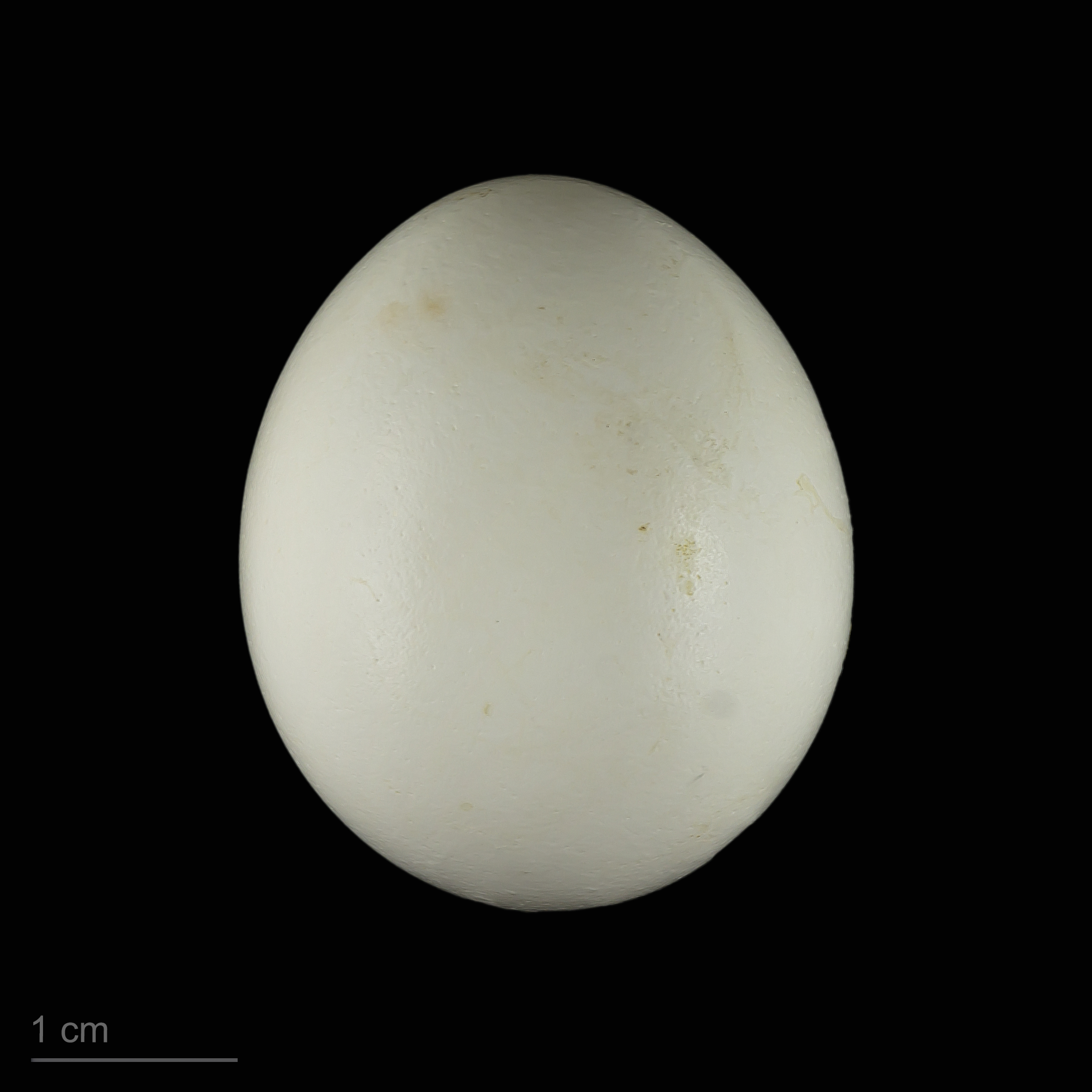
Psittacula derbiana - MHNT

Breeding season usually begins between April and June. The female lays a clutch of two to four eggs (36.1 mm × 27.7 mm [1.42 in × 1.09 in]) in nest holes of trees. The young hatch after an incubation period of about 23 days and will fledge after 8 to 9 weeks.

== Divergence ==
A 2004 study established that the divergence of Psittacula from other parrots occurred between 3.4 and 9.7 million years ago and divergence within Psittacula occurred between 2.5 and 7.7 million years ago. However, the divergence of Derbyan parakeet occurred more recently, between 0.2 and 0.5 million years ago.
