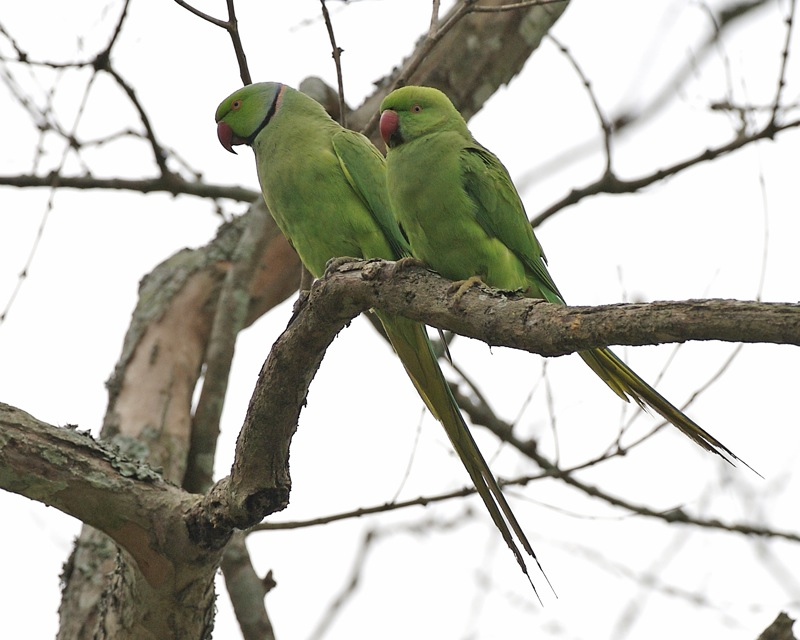
- Rose-ringed parakeets in Assam, India (Psittacula krameri manillensis)

Scientific classification
- Kingdom: Animalia
- Phylum: Chordata
- Class: Aves
- Order: Psittaciformes
- Family: Psittaculidae
- Tribe: Psittaculini
- Genus: Psittacula; Cuvier, 1800

Type species
- Psittaculus alexandri (red-breasted parakeet) Linnaeus, 1758

Species
- see text

= Psittacula =

Genus of birds

Psittacula, also known as Afro-Asian ring-necked parrots, is a genus of parrots from Africa and Southeast Asia. It is a widespread group with a clear concentration of species in south Asia, but also with representatives in Africa and the islands of the Indian Ocean. This is the only genus of parrot which has the majority of its species in continental Asia. Of all the extant species only Psittacula calthrapae, Psittacula caniceps and Psittacula echo do not have a representative subspecies in any part of mainland continental Asia. The rose-ringed parakeet, Psittacula krameri, is one of the most widely distributed of all parrots.

The other two Asian genera, Loriculus and Psittinus are represented by only two species each, which occur in the mainland part of Asia. The majority of the Loriculus species occur on islands. Moreover, since Loriculus is spread across both sides of the Wallace Line it can be considered more Australasian than Asian. These parrots mostly have green plumage, with adults having coloured heads. The bill is stout, and the tail is long and graduated.

== Taxonomy ==
The genus Psittacula was introduced in 1800 by the French naturalist Georges Cuvier. The type species was designated in 1923 by Gregory Mathews as the red-breasted parakeet. The name of the genus is a diminutive of the Latin word psittacus for a "parrot".

The genus includes 16 species, of which three are extinct.

- †Newton's parakeet, Psittacula exsul - extinct (c.1875)
- Echo parakeet, Psittacula eques
  - †Réunion parrot, Psittacula eques eques - extinct mid-18th century
- †Mascarene grey parakeet, Psittacula bensoni - extinct (c.1764) (formerly classified in genus †Lophopsittacus, and still considered such by some authorities)
- Rose-ringed parakeet, Psittacula krameri
- Alexandrine parakeet, Psittacula eupatria
- †Seychelles parakeet, Psittacula wardi - extinct (1883)
- Plum-headed parakeet, Psittacula cyanocephala
- Blossom-headed parakeet, Psittacula roseata
- Slaty-headed parakeet, Psittacula himalayana
- Grey-headed parakeet, Psittacula finschii
- Blue-winged parakeet, Psittacula columboides
- Layard's parakeet, Psittacula calthrapae
- Lord Derby's parakeet, Psittacula derbiana
- Red-breasted parakeet, Psittacula alexandri (also called moustached parrot)
- Long-tailed parakeet, Psittacula longicauda
- Nicobar parakeet, Psittacula caniceps

=== Alternative taxonomy ===
- - - Blossom-headed parakeet, Psittacula roseata
    - - Plum-headed parakeet, Psittacula cyanophala
      - - Slaty-headed parakeet, Psittacula himalayana
        - Grey-headed parakeet, Psittacula finschii
  - - - Layard's parakeet, Psittacula calthrapae
      - Blue-winged parakeet, Psittacula columboides
    - - - - † Seychelles parakeet, Psittacula wardi
          - Alexandrine parakeet, Psittacula eupatria
        - - Rose-ringed parakeet, Psittacula krameri krameri
          - - Echo parakeet, Psittacula eques echo
            - - Rose-ringed parakeet, Psittacula krameri manillensis
              - Rose-ringed parakeet, Psittacula krameri borealis
      - - Blue-rumped parrot, Psittinus cyanurus
        - - - Great-billed parrot, Tanygnathus megalorynchos
            - Azure-rumped parrot, Tanygnathus sumatranus
          - - Long-tailed parakeet, Psittacula longicauda
            - - Red-breasted parakeet, Psittacula alexandri alexandri
              - - Lord Derby's parakeet, Psittacula derbiana
                - - Red-breasted parakeet, Psittacula alexandri fasciata
                  - Red-breasted parakeet, Psittacula alexandri abbotti

Phylogeny of the genus Psittacula based on a study by Michael Braun and coworkers published in 2019.

Genetic evidence has found that the genus Psittacula is likely paraphyletic; for example, genetic analysis has supported merging short-tailed parrots of the genus Tanygnathus, Psittinus, and the extinct Mascarinus with Psittacula. A revised classification was proposed by Michael Braun and coworkers in 2019 that splits the genus Psittacula into multiple monophyletic genera in order to preserve Tanygnathus, Psittinus, and Mascarinus as distinct genera. After the proposed split, the only remaining species in Psittacula sensu stricto are P. derbiana, P. caniceps, and P. alexandri. This is also the taxonomic system followed by the IUCN Red List and BirdLife International. The list of split or monophyletic genera and species (and any of their allied species) is displayed below:

- Genus Himalayapsitta
  - Plum-headed parakeet, Himalayapsitta cyanocephala
  - Grey-headed parakeet, Himalayapsitta finschii
  - Slaty-headed parakeet, Himalayapsitta himalayana
  - Blossom-headed parakeet, Himalayapsitta roseata
- Genus Nicopsitta
  - Blue-winged parakeet, Nicopsitta columboides
  - Layard's parakeet, Nicopsitta calthrapae
- Genus Belocercus
  - Long-tailed parakeet, Belocercus longicauda
- Genus Psittacula
  - Red-breasted parakeet, Psittacula alexandri
  - Lord Derby's parakeet, Psittacula derbiana
  - Nicobar parakeet, Psittacula caniceps
- Genus Palaeornis
  - Alexandrine parakeet, Palaeornis eupatria
  - †Seychelles parakeet, Palaeornis wardi
- Genus Alexandrinus
  - Rose-ringed parakeet, Alexandrinus krameri
  - †Newton's parakeet, Alexandrinus exsul
  - Echo parakeet, Alexandrinus (eques) echo
- Genus Tanygnathus
  - Great-billed parrot, Tanygnathus megalorynchos
  - Blue-naped parrot, Tanygnathus lucionensis
  - Blue-backed parrot, Tanygnathus sumatranus
  - Black-lored parrot, Tanygnathus gramineus
- Genus Psittinus
  - Blue-rumped parrot, Psittinus cyanurus
  - Simeulue parrot, Psittinus abbotti
- Genus †Mascarinus
  - †Mascarene parrot, Mascarinus mascarin
- Genus †Lophopsittacus
  - †Mauritius grey parrot, Lophopsittacus bensoni

The extinct Mascarene grey parrot (P. bensoni) was not sampled in the study and has not been reclassified to Psittacula sensu lato by the IUCN or BirdLife, so it is still classified in Lophopsittacus under this taxonomy and with the common name Mauritius grey parrot. The Nicobar parrot(P. caniceps) was also not sampled but kept in Psittacula by the authorities that incorporated this taxonomy.

The study has also found that the rose-ringed and red-breasted parrots are likely paraphyletic species themselves, and thus need to be split into multiple species.

=== Hypothetical extinct species ===
The Rothschild's or intermediate parakeet P. intermedia, found in northern India, was formerly considered a mystery, as only very few specimens were known. It has since been demonstrated to be a hybrid between the slaty-headed parrot P. himalayana and the plum-headed parrot P. cyanocephala.

The taxonomy of the Réunion parakeet P. eques is also confusing. Extinct since 1770, little evidence even exists of the bird's existence. A study skin had been discovered at the Royal Museum of Scotland, explicitly referencing a book description of the Réunion birds. It is known from other descriptions, as well as illustrations of which it is unknown whether they were drawn from live or stuffed specimens. This may be the only material proof of these birds' existence. Taxonomists are unsure if the birds were a distinct species, or conspecific with the echo parakeet, although genetic analysis supports it being a subspecies of the echo parakeet.
