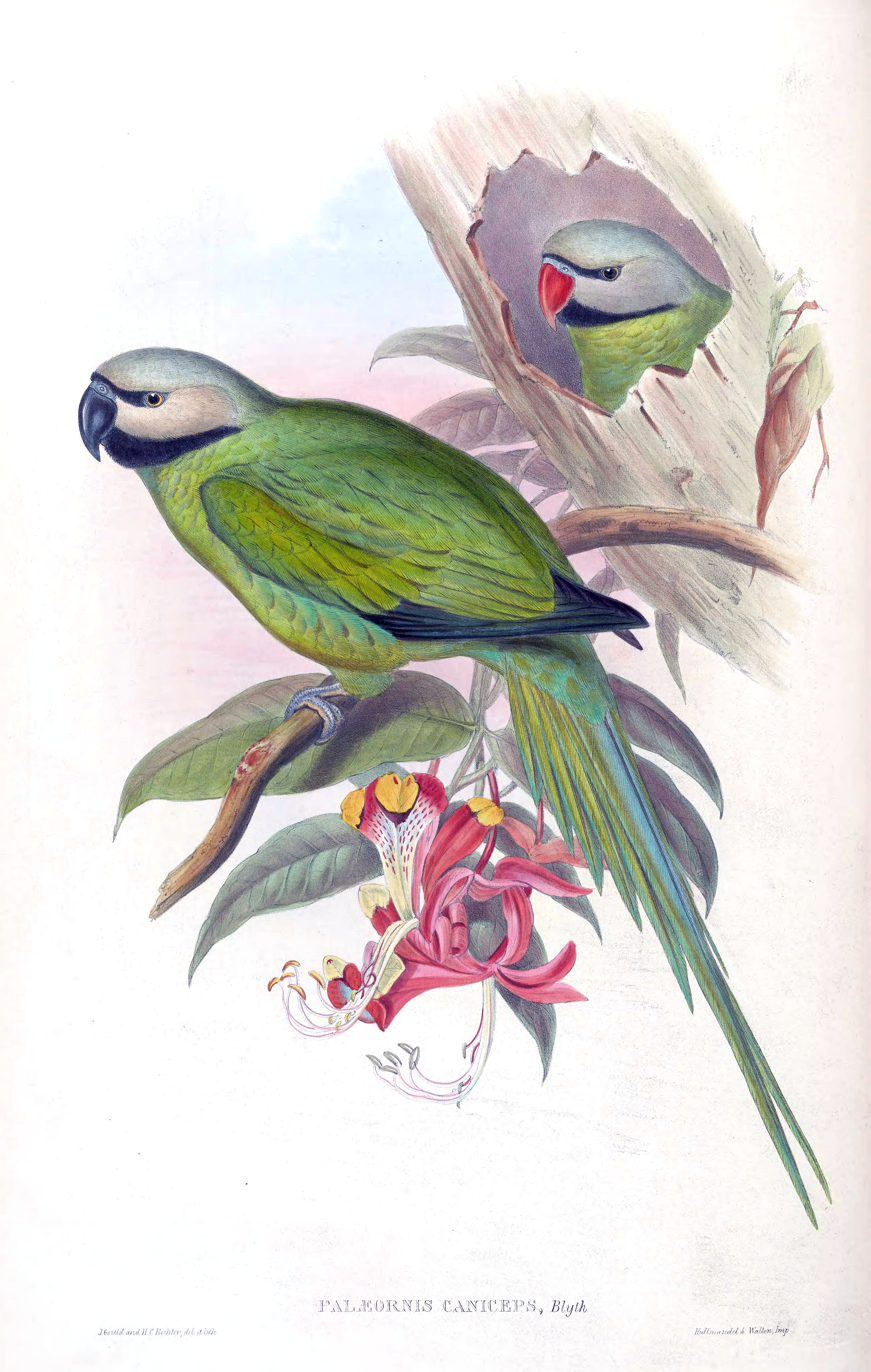

Conservation status
- Near Threatened (IUCN 3.1)
- CITES Appendix II

Scientific classification
- Kingdom: Animalia
- Phylum: Chordata
- Class: Aves
- Order: Psittaciformes
- Family: Psittaculidae
- Genus: Psittacula
- Species: P. caniceps

Binomial name
- Psittacula caniceps (Blyth, 1846)

= Nicobar parakeet =

Species of bird

The Nicobar parakeet (Psittacula caniceps), also known as Blyth's parakeet, is a parrot in the genus Psittacula, endemic to the Nicobar Islands of the Indian Ocean. It is one of the largest parakeets, measuring 56 to 60 cm from the top of the head to the tip of the tail and weighing about 224 g.

== Description ==
It is predominantly green with a yellowish-grey head and prominent black facial markings. It has a black stripe from the forehead to the eyes and a broad black band extending from the lower mandible to the sides of the neck. The iris is reddish-orange. The upper mandible is red in males and black in females, while the lower mandible is black in both sexes. Females, in addition, have a higher presence of blue hinted facial feathers.

It is listed as Near Threatened by the International Union for Conservation of Nature (IUCN). Very little is known about its ecology. However, it is known that these species reside in the tall leafy trees on these islands and have a preference for the fruit of Pandanus palms trees. Its conservation status is near threatened as human settlement is increasing resulting in a decline of resources for their habitats and also because of the popularity of including them in the caged bird trade.
