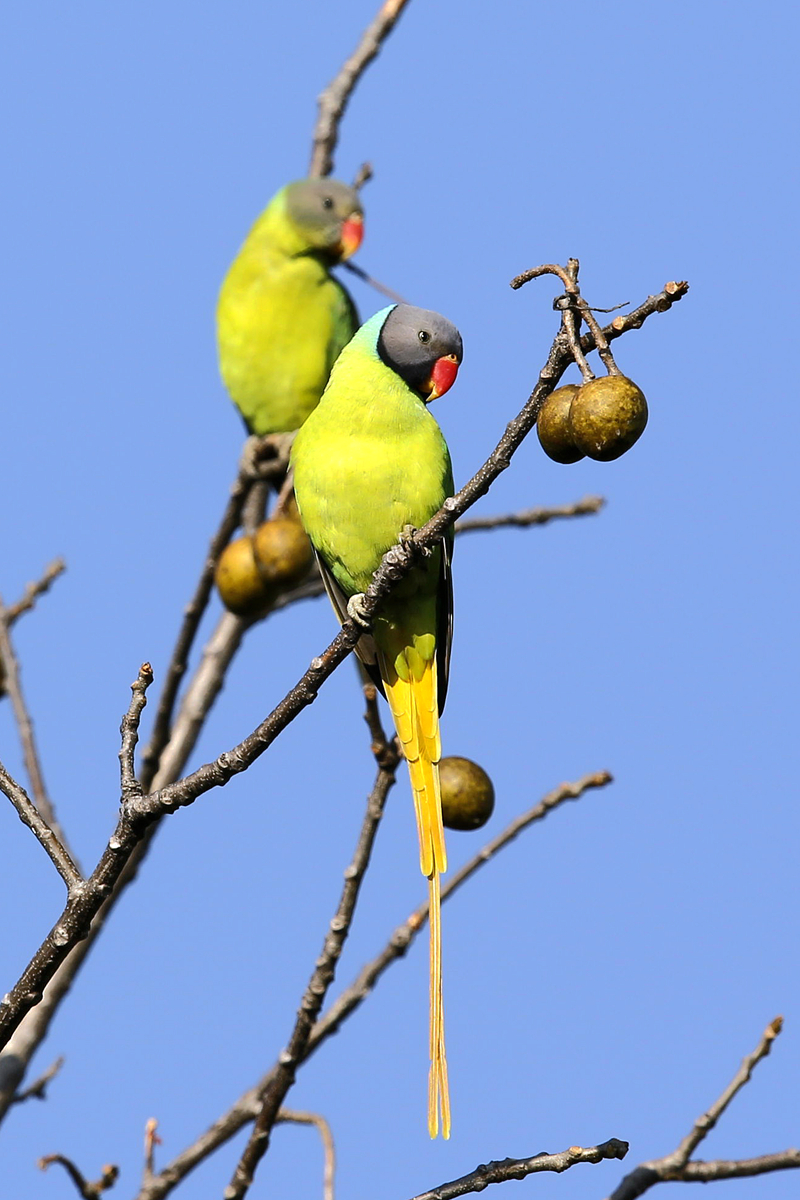
- Male, with female behind, Mount Victoria, Myanmar

Conservation status
- Near Threatened (IUCN 3.1)
- CITES Appendix II

Scientific classification
- Kingdom: Animalia
- Phylum: Chordata
- Class: Aves
- Order: Psittaciformes
- Family: Psittaculidae
- Genus: Psittacula
- Species: P. finschii

Binomial name
- Psittacula finschii (Hume, 1874)

Synonyms
- Himalayapsitta finschii

= Grey-headed parakeet =

Species of bird

The grey-headed parakeet (Psittacula finschii) is closely related to the slaty-headed parakeet which together form a super-species. It is found in Southeast Asia from north-eastern India to Vietnam.

The binomial of this bird commemorates the German naturalist and explorer Otto Finsch.

== Description ==
Its face is grey/green, and the rest of its head is dull green with faint pale green band below cheeks to hindcrown and its wing are patch absent and has a long tail.

== Distribution & habitat ==
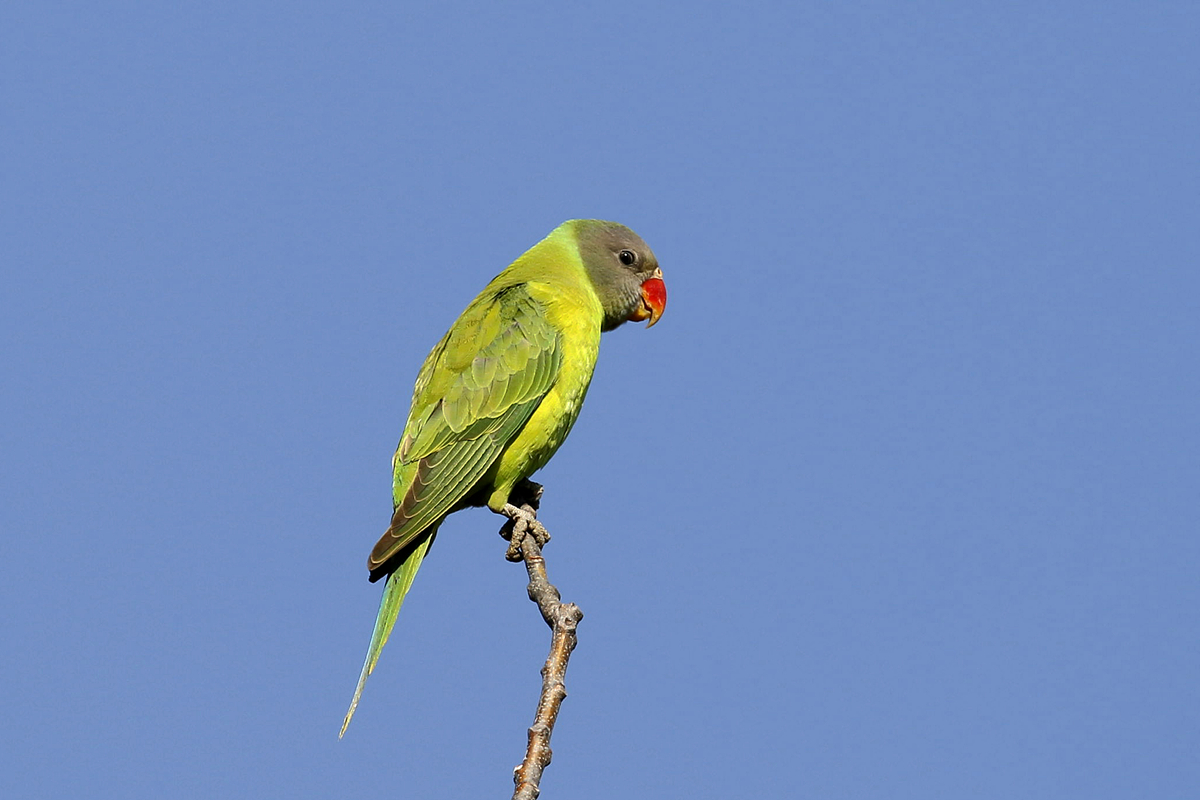
Female, Mount Victoria, Myanmar

The grey headed parakeet has a wide range in Southeast Asia. It is found in most of Vietnam, the entire country of Laos, most of eastern Cambodia, northern Thailand, in most of Myanmar (except for Tanintharyi Region), in the Yunnan province of China, in far east Bangladesh (extremely rare), nearly all of Northeast India, and the far southeast of Bhutan. The global population size is not known, but this bird is reported to be uncommon in China, with varying statuses everywhere else. It is found at altitudes of up to 2,700 metres in forests consisting of oak, teak, pine, and other trees. It also resides in deciduous forest hillsides and farmland with scattered trees. In Cambodia, it regularly occurs in areas with evergreen and semi-evergreen vegetation.

== Behaviour and ecology ==
The grey-headed parakeet has a widely varied diet of different species of leaf buds, seeds, fruit, berries, and flowers. It is often seen in flocks or family parties, with larger groups reported. It is usually a resident bird, with some seasonal altitudinal movement in response to food availability. It often gathers in large flocks to roost at dusk. After their breeding season from January–March, females often lay a clutch of 4-5 eggs that are around 28.5 x 22.0 mm.

== Threats ==
The grey-headed parakeet is often captured in the exotic bird trade and many are locally kept as pets. They tend to be popular in some small villages in southern China and surrounding areas. The constant trapping of birds is greatly affecting the wild population. Deforestation and logging of the bird's natural forest habitat is also making a negative impact on the parakeet's population.
