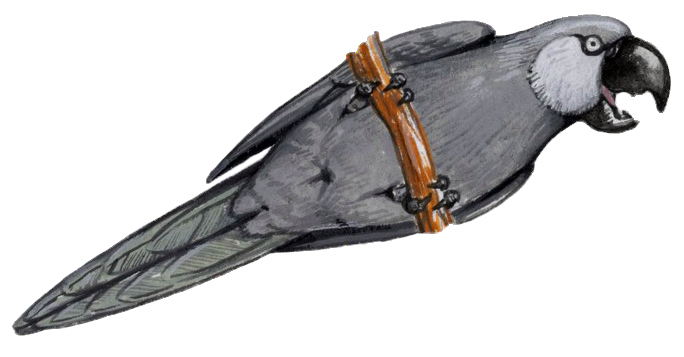
- Life restoration by Julian P. Hume

Conservation status
- Extinct (1764) (IUCN 3.1)

Scientific classification
- Kingdom: Animalia
- Phylum: Chordata
- Class: Aves
- Order: Psittaciformes
- Family: Psittaculidae
- Genus: Psittacula
- Species: †P. bensoni

Binomial name
- †Psittacula bensoni (Holyoak, 1973)
- Location of Mauritius, where subfossils of this species have been found

Synonyms
- Lophopsittacus bensoni Holyoak, 1973

= Mascarene grey parakeet =

Extinct parrot from Mauritius and Réunion

The Mascarene grey parakeet, Mauritius grey parrot, or Thirioux's grey parrot (Psittacula bensoni), is an extinct species of parrot which was endemic to the Mascarene Islands of Mauritius and Réunion in the western Indian Ocean. It has been classified as a member of the tribe Psittaculini, along with other parrots from the Islands.

Subfossil bones of the Mascarene grey parakeet found on Mauritius were first described in 1973 as belonging to a smaller relative of the broad-billed parrot in the genus Lophopsittacus. Apart from their size, the bones were very similar to those of other Mascarene parrots. The subfossils were later connected with 17th- and 18th-century descriptions of small grey parrots on Mauritius and Réunion, together with a single illustration published in a journal describing a voyage in 1602, and the species was instead reassigned to the genus Psittacula.

The Mascarene grey parakeet was grey, had a long tail, and was larger than other species of the genus Psittacula, which are usually green. The grey parrots were said to be easy to hunt, as the capture of one would result in its calling out to summon the whole flock. They were also considered to be crop pests, and being such easy prey meant that they were extensively hunted. Coupled with deforestation, this pushed them into extinction. This had happened by the 1730s on Réunion and by the 1760s on Mauritius.

== Taxonomy ==
In 1973, English ornithologist Daniel T. Holyoak described some small parrot bones that he had discovered among a collection of broad-billed parrot (Lophopsittacus mauritianus) subfossils in the Zoology Museum of Cambridge University. These remains had been collected in the early 20th century by French amateur naturalist Louis Etienne Thirioux, who had found them in a cave on Le Pouce mountain, on the Mascarene Island of Mauritius. They were placed in the zoology museum by 1908. Apart from their size and robustness, Holyoak did not find the bones to be distinct from those of the Mascarene parrot genera Lophopsittacus, Mascarinus (the Mascarene parrot), Necropsittacus (the Rodrigues parrot), and Psittacula (which had two or three other species inhabiting the Mascarene Islands). Because of their similarities, Holyoak considered all these genera to be closely related.

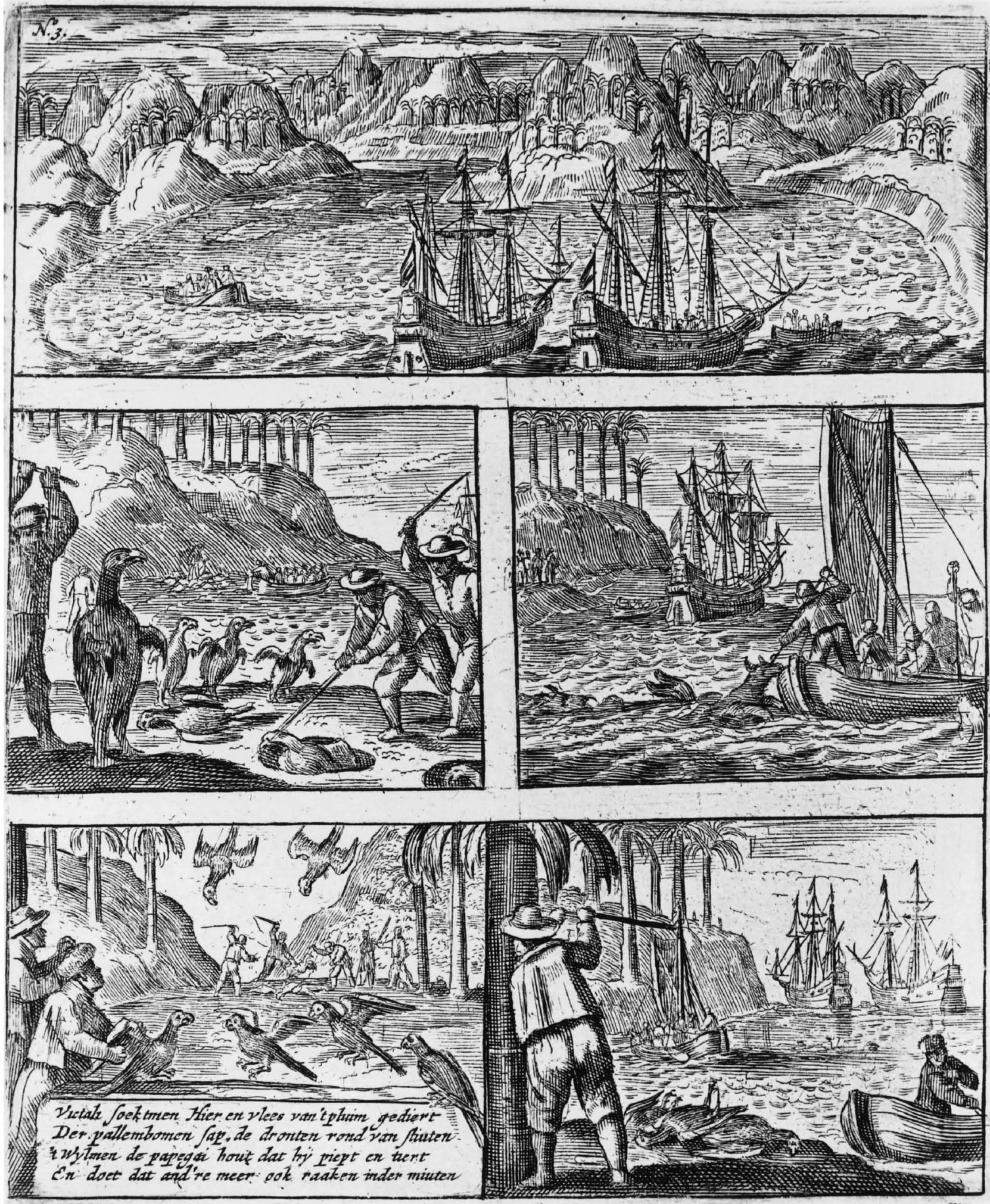
1648 engraving depicting the killing of parrots (bottom, possibly this species) and other animals on Mauritius in 1602

Holyoak provisionally placed the new species in the same genus as the broad-billed parrot, naming it Lophopsittacus bensoni; the name honours English ornithologist Constantine W. Benson, for his work on birds from the Indian Ocean, and in classifying bird collections at Cambridge. Holyoak also mentioned the possibility that the remains could represent a small subspecies of Necropsittacus or a wide-beaked form of Mascarinus, but maintained that they were best considered as belonging to a distinct species. The holotype specimen is a mandibular symphysis, with the specimen number UMZC 577a. Other known remains include upper mandibles, a palatine bone, and tarsometatarsi. The species has since been excavated from the Mare aux Songes swamp on Mauritius, from which subfossils of most of the other endemic bird species have been identified as well.

Old, vague accounts of several different now-extinct Mascarene parrots have created much confusion for the scientists who subsequently examined them. In 1967, American ornithologist James Greenway speculated that 17th- and 18th-century reports of then-unidentified grey parrots on Mauritius referred to the broad-billed parrot. In 1987, English ecologist Anthony S. Cheke correlated the L. bensoni subfossils with the grey parrots reported from Mauritius and Réunion, which had previously been ignored, or considered references to broad-billed parrots. Further study of contemporary accounts indicates that the broad-billed parrot was not grey, but had multiple colours.

In 2007, the English palaeontologist Julian P. Hume reclassified L. bensoni as a member of the genus Psittacula, as he found it to be generically distinct from Lophopsittacus, but morphologically similar to the Alexandrine parakeet (Psittacula eupatria). Hume also pointed out that an engraving accompanying the 1648 published version of Dutch captain Willem van West-Zanen's journal may be the only definite depiction of this species. The engraving shows the killing of dodos (depicted as penguin-like), a dugong, and parrots on Mauritius in 1602; the depicted method of catching parrots matches that used on Mascarene grey parakeets according to contemporary accounts. That the parrots were grey was mentioned in the journal's text but not in the caption of the engraving. Hume coined the new common name "Thirioux's grey parrot" in honour of the original collector. The IOC World Bird List instead used the common name "Mascarene grey parakeet".

The population of grey parrots described from the island of Réunion (referred to as Psittacula cf. bensoni by Hume) is thought to have been conspecific with that on Mauritius. Until subfossils of P. bensoni are found on Réunion, it cannot be confirmed whether the grey parrots of the two islands belonged to the same species. In the 1860s, French naturalists Charles Coquerel and Auguste Vinson suggested these could have been parrots of the genus Coracopsis, but fossils of neither that genus nor Psittacula have ever been found on Réunion. Whilst Coracopsis parrots are known to have been introduced to that island in the 1700s, a population did not become established. While no live or dead Mascarene grey parakeets are known with certainty to have been exported, Hume has suggested that a brown parrot specimen—once housed in Cabinet du Roi but now lost—may have been a discoloured old Mascarene grey parakeet, or perhaps a lesser vasa parrot (Coracopsis nigra). This specimen was described by French naturalist Comte de Buffon in 1779. Cheke and Hume suggested in 2008 that Mascarene grey parakeets did not reach Europe because they were considered unimpressive or had too specialised a diet.

=== Evolution ===
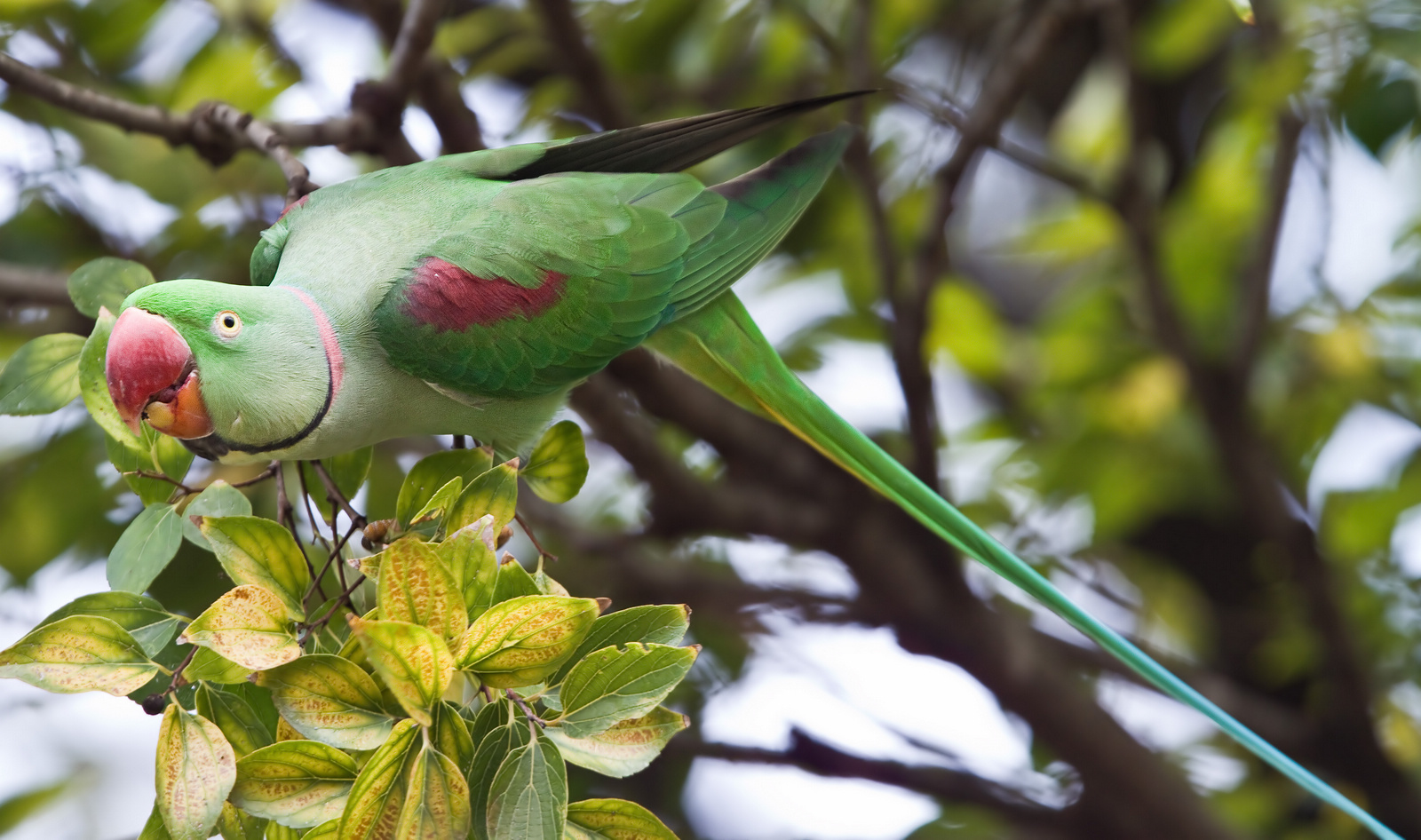
The skeletally similar Alexandrine parakeet

Based on morphological features, the Alexandrine parakeet has been proposed as the founder population for all Psittacula species on Indian Ocean islands, with new populations settling during the species' southwards colonisation from its native South Asia. Features of that species gradually disappear in species further away from its range. Many endemic Mascarene birds, including the dodo, are descended from South Asian ancestors, and Hume has proposed that this may also be the case for all the parrots there. Sea levels were lower during the Pleistocene, so it was possible for species to colonise some of these less isolated islands.

Although most extinct parrot species of the Mascarenes are poorly known, subfossil remains show that they shared common features such as enlarged heads and jaws, reduced pectoral bones, and robust leg bones. Hume has suggested that they all have a common origin in the radiation of the tribe Psittaculini, basing this theory on morphological features and the fact that parrots from that group have managed to colonise many isolated islands in the Indian Ocean. The Psittaculini could have invaded the area several times, as many of the species were so specialised that they may have evolved significantly on hotspot islands before the Mascarenes emerged from the sea. Other members of the genus Psittacula from the Mascarenes include the extant echo parakeet (Psittacula eques) of Mauritius and formerly Réunion, and Newton's parakeet (Psittacula exsul) of Rodrigues.

Genetic studies in the early 21st century found the genus Psittacula to be paraphyletic (an unnatural grouping excluding some of its subgroups), with for example the Mascarene parrot nested within it. To solve the issue, the German ornithologist Michael P. Braun and colleagues proposed in 2016 and 2019 that Psittacula should be split into multiple genera. They therefore placed the echo and Newton's parakeets, from which DNA could be extracted, in the genus Alexandrinus instead, and retained the Mascarene parrot in Mascarinus.

== Description ==
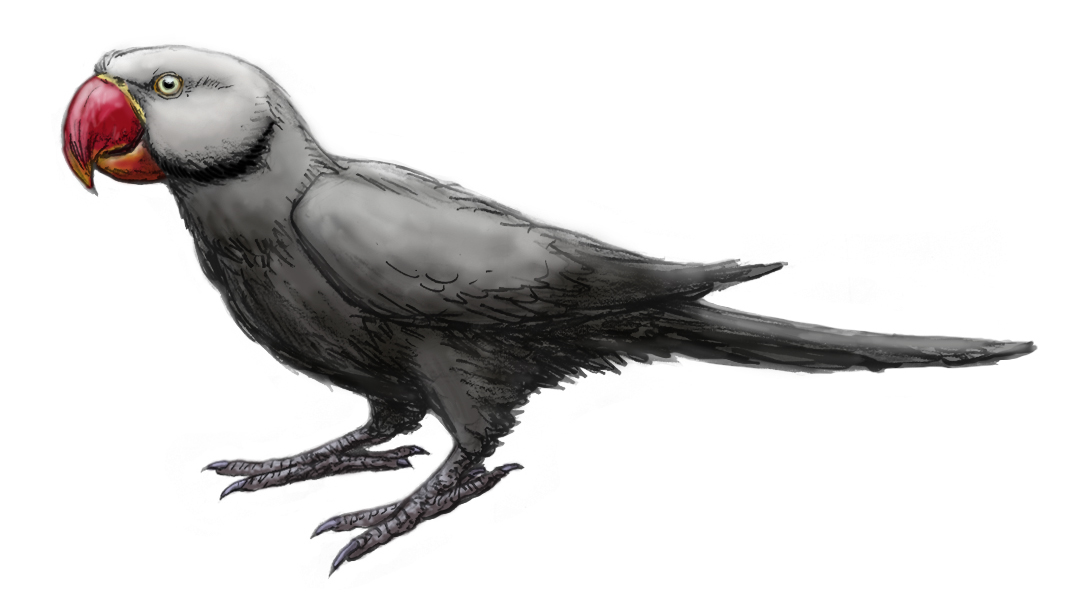
Restoration showing a red beak and black collar, as seen in relatives

Contemporary accounts describe the Mascarene grey parakeet as a grey, long-tailed parrot. Subfossils show that its beak was about 29% longer than that of the sympatric echo parakeet, and comparatively broad, since the rami of each half of the mandible were deflected more outwards to the sides. Members of the Psittacula commonly have large, red beaks, and long tail feathers, with the central ones being the longest. It also differed from its congeners in other osteological details. It was skeletally similar to the Alexandrine parakeet, but some of its bones were larger and more robust. Its colouration also separated it from all other members of Psittacula, the majority of which are green or partially green.

Based on subfossils, the Mascarene grey parakeet was smaller than the broad-billed parrot and the Rodrigues parrot, but similar in size to the Mascarene parrot, though with a wider beak. The mandibular symphysis (central jaw ridge) was 2.7–2.9 mm (0.11–0.11 in) thick along the mid-line, the palatine (part of the palate) was 31.1 mm (1.22 in), and the tarsometatarsus (bone in the lower leg) was 22–22.5 mm (0.87–0.89 in). The grey parrots from Réunion were described as being larger than the sympatric echo parakeet.

== Behaviour and ecology ==
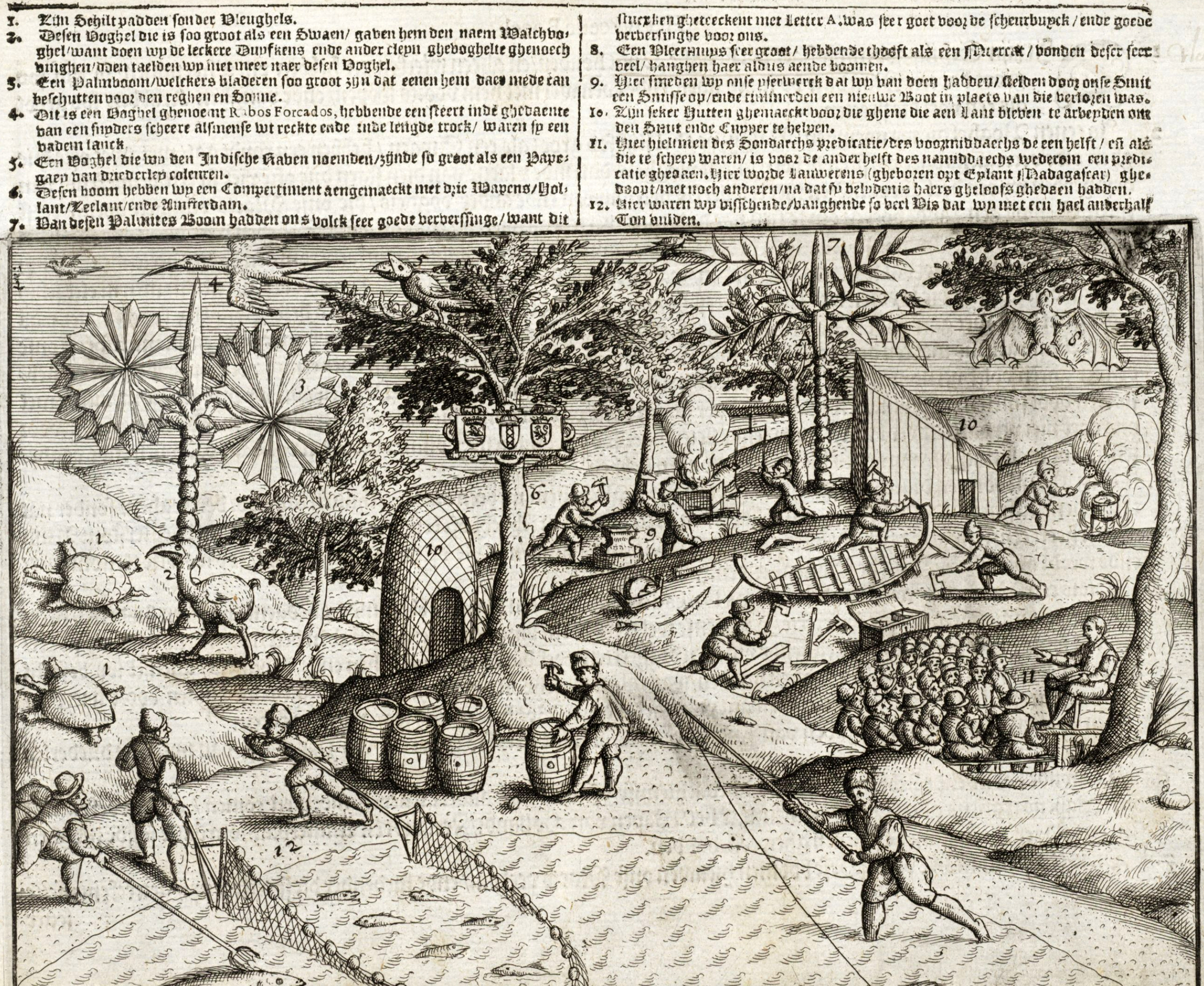
Depiction of the Dutch on Mauritius in 1598, with various parrots above

According to Cheke and Hume, the anatomy of the Mascarene grey parakeet suggests that its habits were largely terrestrial, and it may have eaten the fruits of the hurricane palm and the bottle palm, due to their abundance. Like the extinct Mauritian duck and the Mascarene coot, it appears that the Mascarene grey parakeet inhabited both Mauritius and Réunion. Both populations were said to be easy to hunt by capturing one individual and making it call out, which would summon an entire flock.

Van West-Zanen, who visited Mauritius in 1602, was the first to mention grey parrots there, and he also described the hunting methods used:

... some of the people went bird hunting. They could grab as many birds as they wished and could catch them by hand. It was an entertaining sight to see. The grey parrots are especially tame and if one is caught and made to cry out, soon hundreds of the birds fly around ones' ears, which were then hit to the ground with little sticks.

Dutch sailor Willem Ysbrandtszoon Bontekoe was on Réunion in 1618, and described the same behaviour, in the first account of the grey parrots there:

Coming further inland we found [a] great number of geese, doves, grey parrots and other birds, also many land-turtles... And what we most did marvel at, when we held one of the parrots and other birds and squeezed it till it screamed, there came all the others from thereabout as if they would free it and let themselves be caught as well, so we had enough of them to eat.

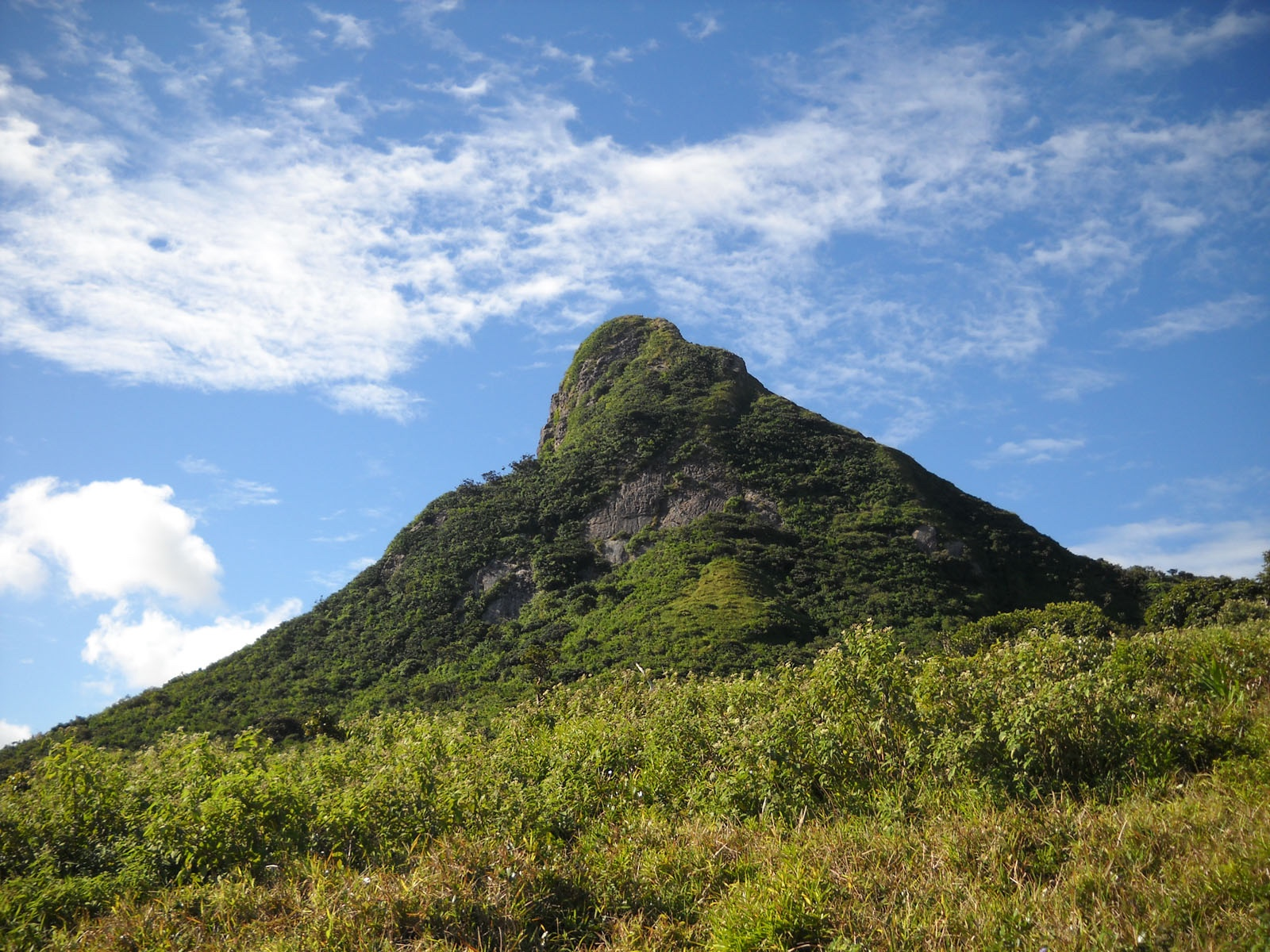
Subfossils of this parrot have been found in caves on Le Pouce mountain

In 1705, French pilot engineer Jean Feuilley gave a more detailed description of the parrots of Réunion and their ecology:

There are several sorts of parrot, of different sizes and colours. Some are the size of a hen, grey, the beak red [Mascarene parrot]; others the same colour the size of a pigeon [Mascarene grey parakeet], and yet others, smaller, are green [echo parakeet]. There are great quantities, especially in the Sainte-Suzanne area and on the mountainsides. They are very good to eat, especially when they are fat, which is from the month of June until the month of September, because at that time the trees produce a certain wild seed that these birds eat.

Many other endemic species of Mauritius and Réunion were lost after the arrival of humans, so that the ecosystems of these islands are severely damaged and hard to reconstruct. Before humans arrived, the islands were entirely covered in forests, very little of which remains today, because of deforestation. The surviving endemic fauna is still seriously threatened. On Mauritius, the Mascarene grey parakeet lived alongside other recently extinct birds such as the dodo, the red rail, the broad-billed parrot, the Mauritius blue pigeon, the Mauritius scops owl, the Mascarene coot, the Mauritian shelduck, the Mauritian duck, and the Mauritius night heron. On Réunion, it lived alongside the Réunion ibis, the hoopoe starling, the Mascarene parrot, the local subspecies of the echo parakeet, the Réunion swamphen, the Réunion scops owl, the Réunion night heron, and the Réunion pink pigeon.

== Extinction ==
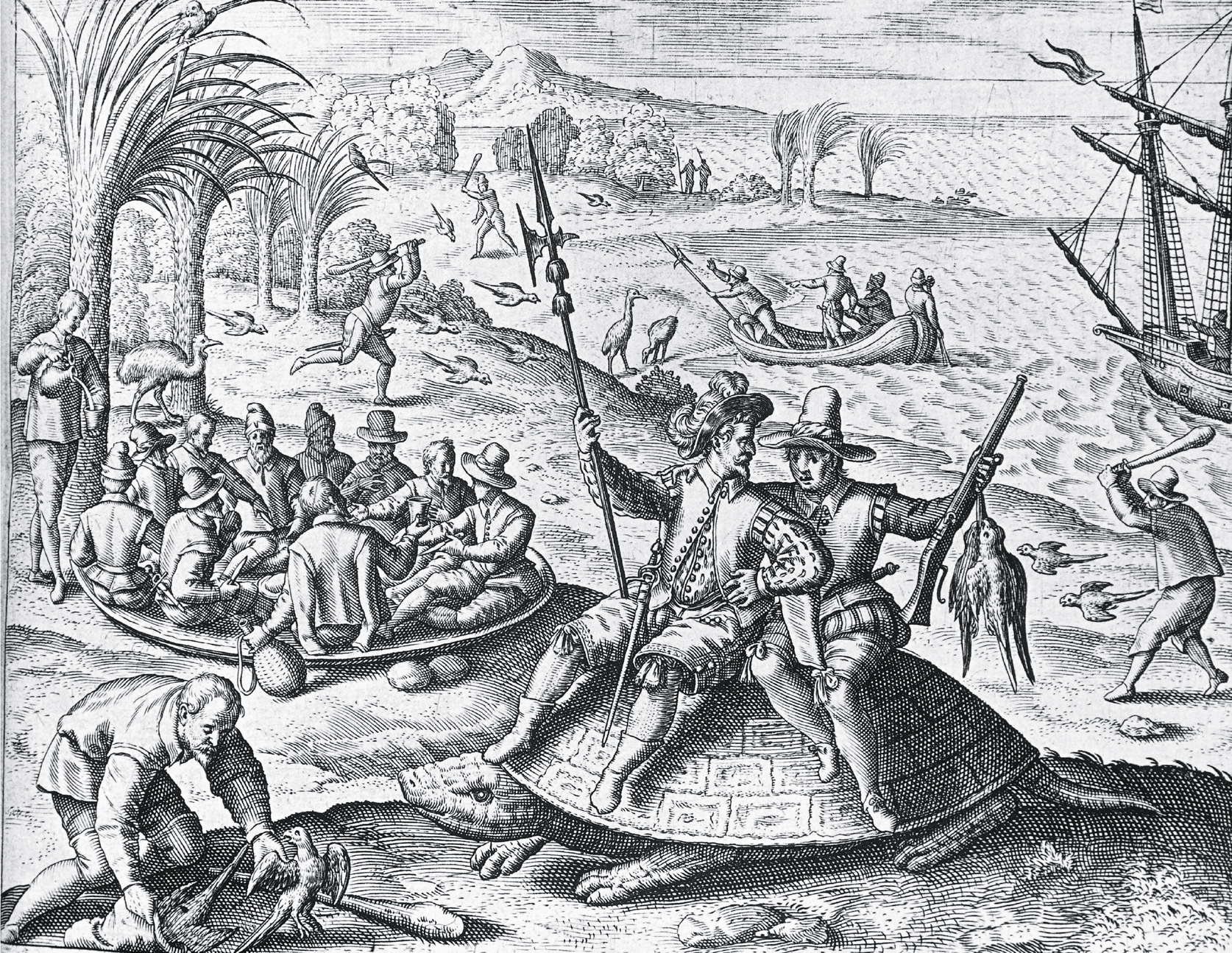
Depiction of the Dutch hunting parrots on Mauritius in 1598

To the sailors who visited the Mascarene Islands from 1598 onwards, the fauna was mainly interesting from a culinary standpoint. Of the eight or so parrot species endemic to the Mascarenes, only the echo parakeet has survived. The others likely all vanished due to a combination of extensive hunting and deforestation. Being easily caught, the Mascarene grey parakeet was often hunted in abundance by early visitors to Mauritius and Réunion. As the parrots fattened themselves from June to September, they were particularly sought after at this time of the year. An account by Dutch admiral Steven van der Hagen from 1606 even suggests that the grey parrots of Mauritius were sometimes killed for amusement.

In the 1720s, French traveller Sieur Dubois stated that the grey parrots on Réunion were especially sought after during their fat season, and also claimed they were crop-pests:

Grey parrots, as good [to eat] as the pigeons... All the birds of this island have their season at different times, being six months in the low country and six months in the mountains when returning, they are very fat and good to eat... The sparrows [Foudia], grey parrots, pigeons and other birds, bats [Pteropus sp.], cause plenty of damage, some to cereals others to fruit.

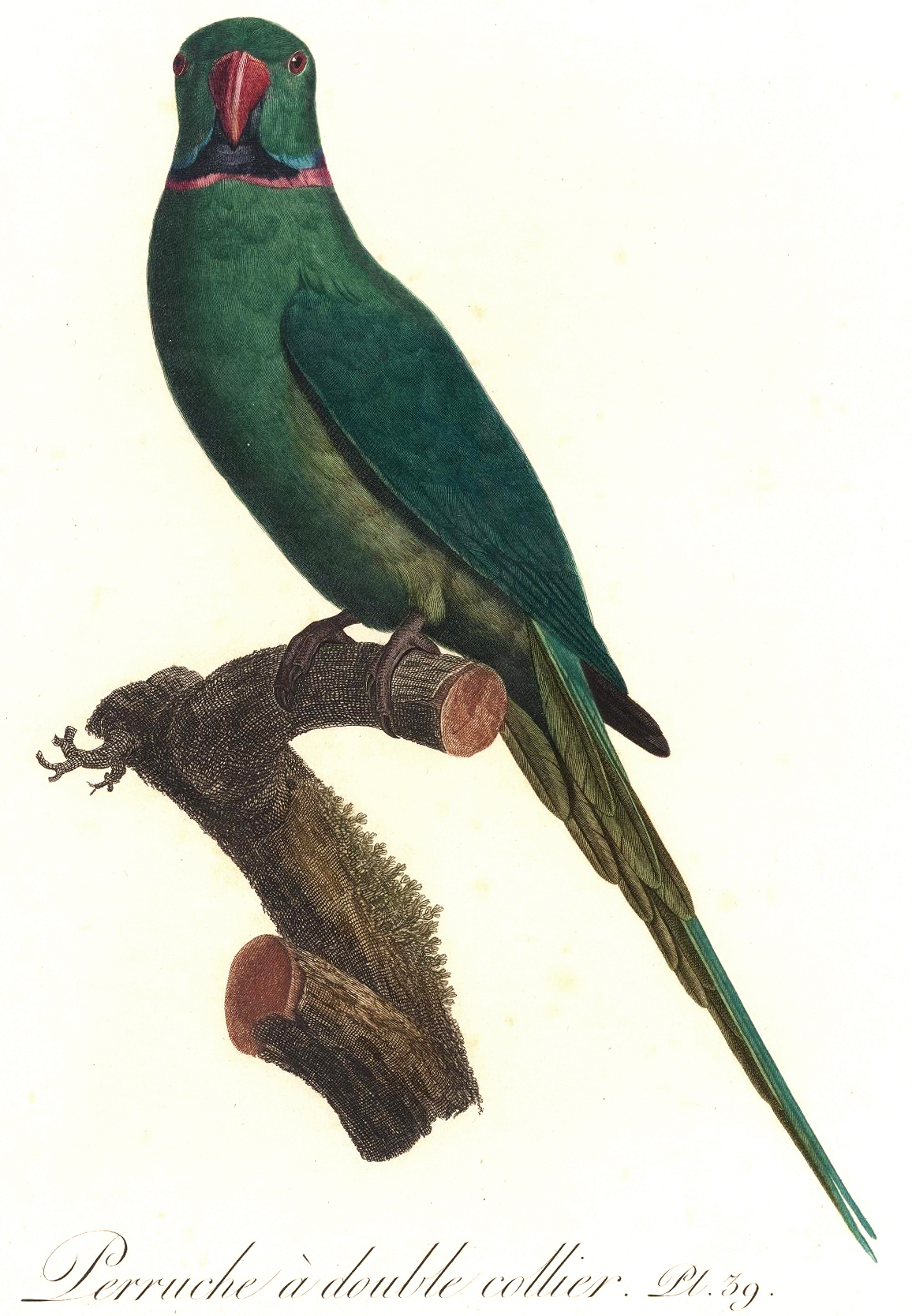
The echo parakeet was sympatric with this species on both Mauritius and Réunion

That these birds were said to damage crops probably contributed to their being hunted. The French settlers began to clear forests using the slash-and-burn technique in the 1730s, which in itself would have had a large effect on the population of parrots and other animals that nest in tree cavities.

The grey parrots appear to have been common on Mauritius until the 1750s in spite of the pressure from humans, but since they were last mentioned by French colonist Charpentier de Cossigny in 1759 (published in 1764), they probably became extinct shortly after this time. The grey parrots of Réunion were last mentioned in 1732, also by Cossigny. This final account gives an insight as to how he regarded the culinary quality of parrots from Réunion:

The woods are full of parrots, either completely grey [Mascarene grey parrot] or completely green [echo parakeet]. They were eaten a lot formerly, the grey especially, but both are always lean and very tough whatever sauce one puts on them.

The 1648 engraving possibly depicting this species was captioned with a Dutch poem, here in English naturalist Hugh Strickland's 1848 translation:

For food the seamen hunt the flesh of feathered fowl,
They tap the palms, and round-rumped dodos they destroy,
The parrot's life they spare that he may peep and howl,
And thus his fellows to imprisonment decoy.
