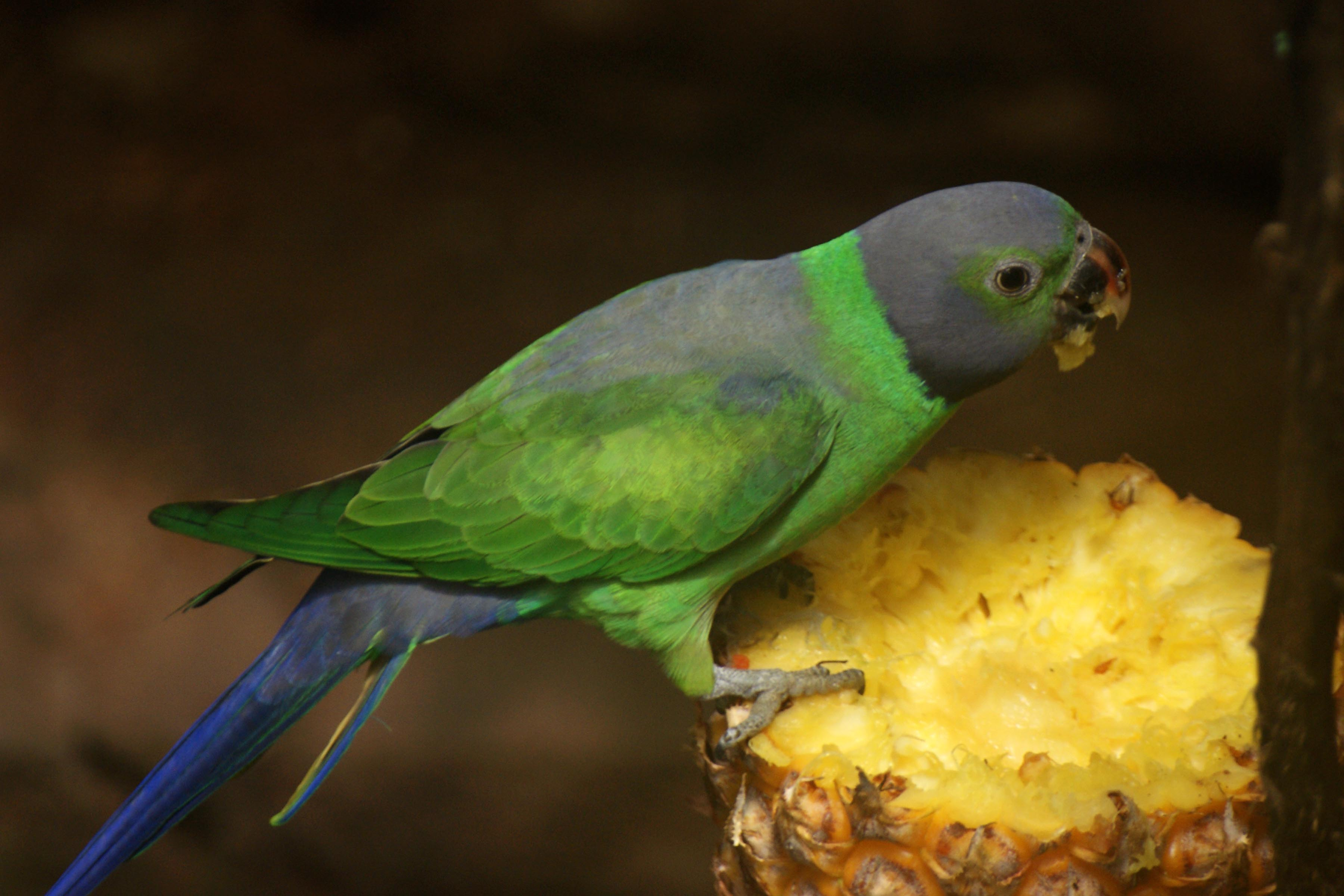
- Female eating fruit in Sri Lanka

Conservation status
- Least Concern (IUCN 3.1)
- CITES Appendix II

Scientific classification
- Kingdom: Animalia
- Phylum: Chordata
- Class: Aves
- Order: Psittaciformes
- Family: Psittaculidae
- Genus: Psittacula
- Species: P. calthrapae

Binomial name
- Psittacula calthrapae (Blyth, 1849)
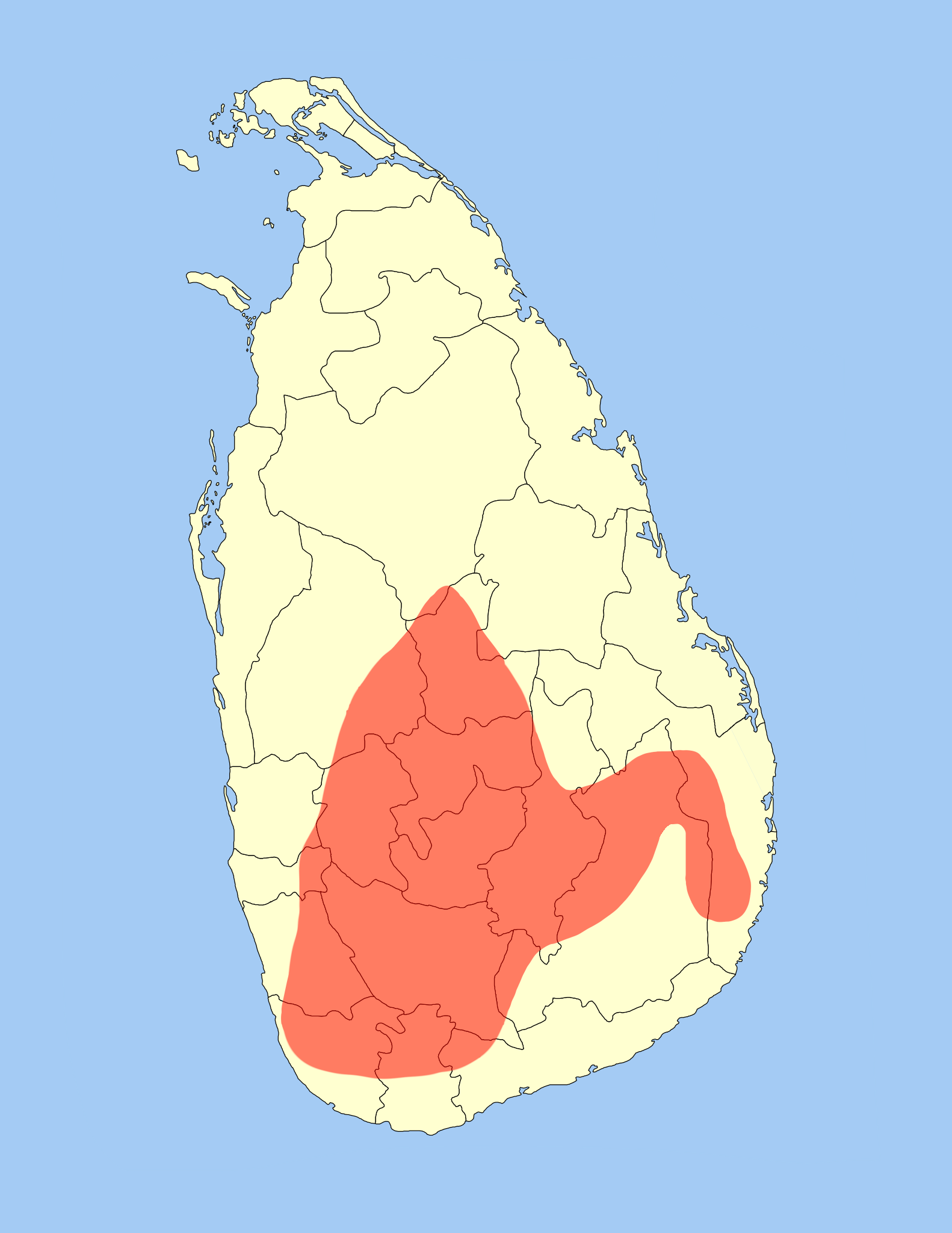

Synonyms
- Nicopsitta calthrapae (Blyth, 1849); Psittacula calthorpae Dickinson (2003); Psittacula calthrapae (Blyth, 1849); Psittacula calthropae

= Layard's parakeet =

Species of bird

Layard's parakeet or the emerald-collared parakeet, (Psittacula calthrapae) is a parrot which is a resident endemic breeder in Sri Lanka. The common name of this bird commemorates the British naturalist Edgar Leopold Layard; his first wife, Barbara Anne Calthrop, whom he married in 1845, is commemorated in the specific epithet.

== Description ==
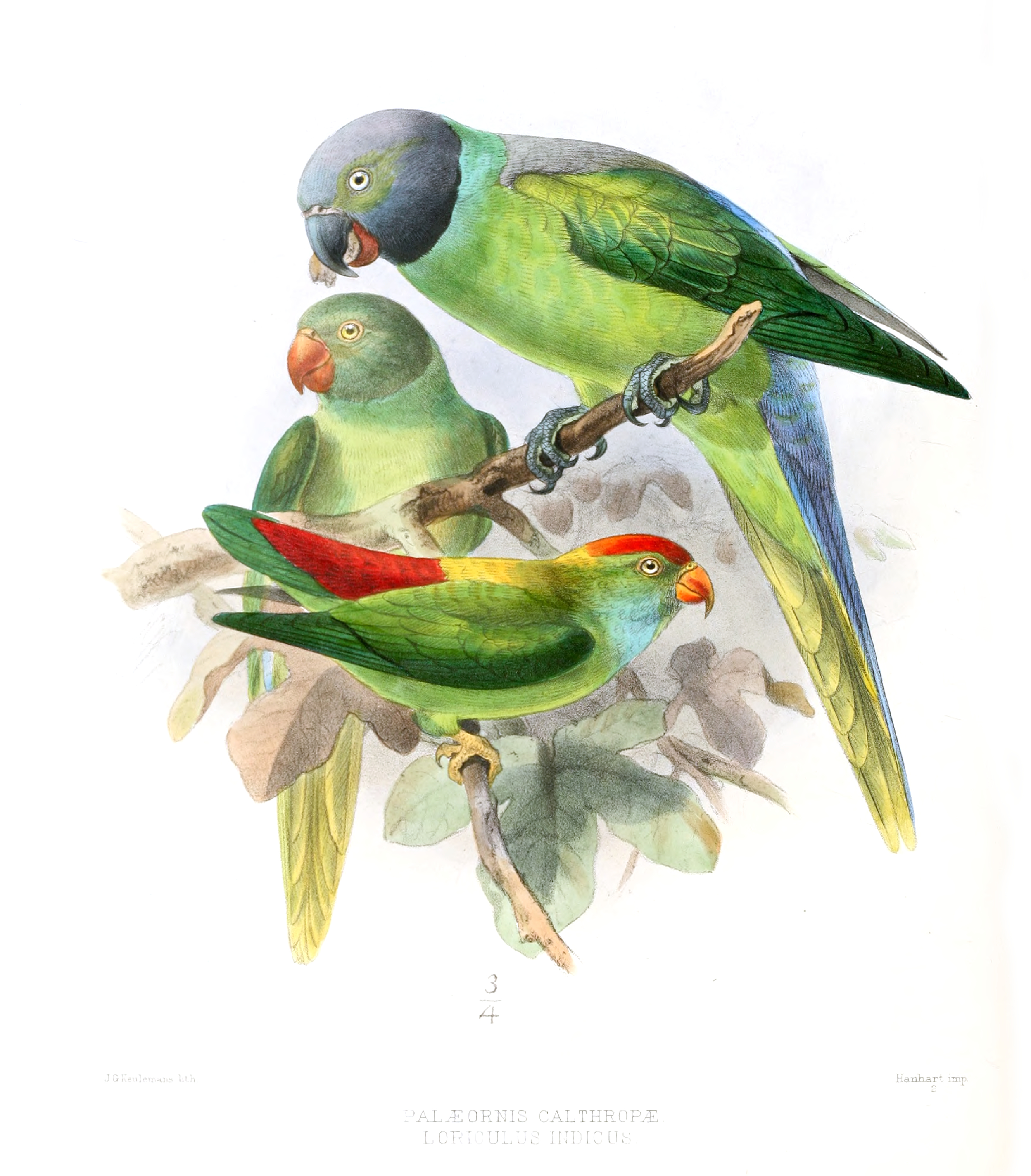

Layard's parakeet is a green parrot, 29 cm (11 in) long including a tail up to 13 cm (5.1 in). The adult has a bluish-grey head and back, separated by a green collar. There is a broad black chin stripe and the tail is blue tipped yellow. The upper mandible of the male's bill is red and the lower mandible is brown.

The female is similar, but has an all black beak and less green on the face than the male. Immature birds are mainly green, with an orange bill.

== Behaviour ==
Layard's parakeet is a bird of forests, particularly at the edges and in clearings, and also gardens. It is locally common. It undergoes local movements, driven mainly by the availability of the fruit, seeds, buds and blossoms that make up its diet. It is less gregarious than some of its relatives, and is usually in small groups outside the breeding season, when it often feeds with brahminy starlings. Its flight is swift and direct, and the call is a raucous chattering. It nests in holes in large trees, laying 3–4 white eggs.

== In culture ==
In Sri Lanka, this bird is knowns as alu girawa අළු ගිරවා (ash-parrot) in Sinhala. This bird appears on a 50c Sri Lankan postal stamp. Also this bird appears in 500 Sri Lankan rupee bank note (2010 series).

== Cited texts ==
- Forshaw, Joseph M. (2006). Parrots of the World; an Identification Guide. Illustrated by Frank Knight. Princeton University Press. ISBN 0-691-09251-6.
