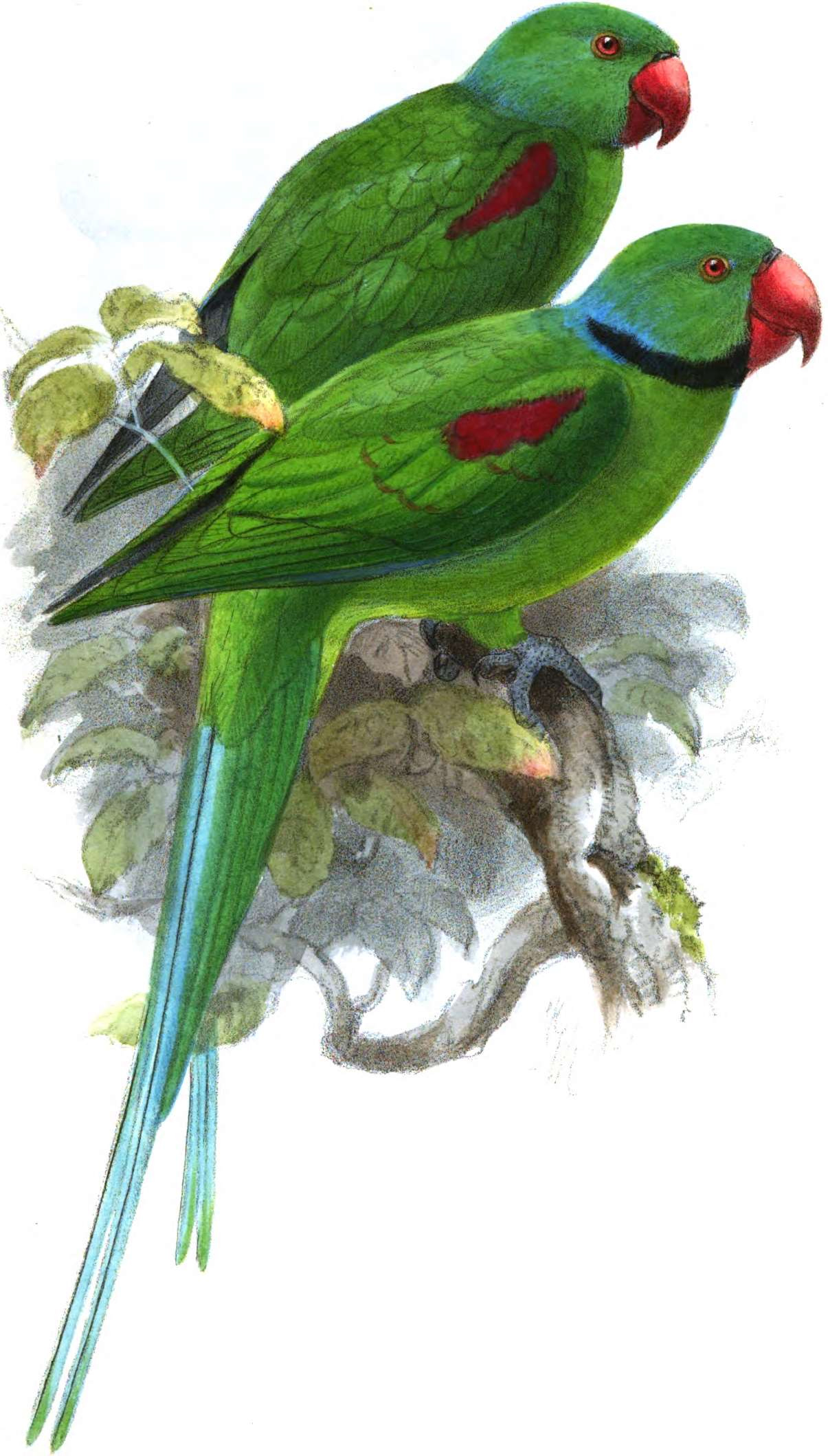
- Illustration of a male (front) and female, by John Gerrard Keulemans, 1876

Conservation status
- Extinct (1893) (IUCN 3.1)

Scientific classification
- Kingdom: Animalia
- Phylum: Chordata
- Class: Aves
- Order: Psittaciformes
- Family: Psittaculidae
- Genus: Psittacula
- Species: †P. wardi

Binomial name
- †Psittacula wardi (Newton, E., 1867)
- Location of the Seychelles

Synonyms
- Palaeornis wardi Newton, E., 1867; Psittacula eupatria wardi (Newton, E., 1867)

= Seychelles parakeet =

Extinct bird species once endemic to Seychelles

The Seychelles parakeet or Seychelles Island parrot (Psittacula wardi) is an extinct species of parrot that was endemic to the Seychelles in the Indian Ocean. It was scientifically named Palaeornis wardi by the British ornithologist Edward Newton in 1867, and the specific name honours the British civil commissioner Swinburne Ward who procured the specimens that formed the basis for the description. It was found on the islands of Mahé, Silhouette, and possibly Praslin. Ten skin specimens exist today, but no skeletons. Though the species was later moved to the genus Psittacula, genetic studies have led some researchers to suggest it should belong in a reinstated Palaeornis along with the closely related Alexandrine parakeet (P. eupatria) of Asia.

This parakeet was about 41 cm (16 in) in length, with a long, pointed tail. The male was mainly green, with blue on parts of the head, and a black stripe on the cheek. The underside was yellowish, and the bird had a purple-red patch on the wings. The tail was blue, green, and yellow, and the bill was red and yellow. The female lacked the cheek-stripe, and the juvenile resembled the female. A single depiction from life is known, an 1883 painting by the British artist Marianne North. Little is known regarding the bird's habits, but they were presumably similar to those of the Alexandrine parakeet, associating in groups in forests, and making flights between communal roost sites and feeding areas. It lived in native forest, but adapted to cultivated areas as these were cleared, and its diet included fruit. Though abundant in 1811, it had become rare by 1867 because of human persecution for its perceived damage to crops. The last confirmed individual was shot in 1893, and no birds could be found by 1906.

== Taxonomy ==
In 1867, the British ornithologist Edward Newton scientifically described and named new species he had obtained during his month-long stay on the Seychelles, including the Seychelles parakeet, which he named Palaeornis wardi. He stated its common name was "cateau vert", and that the specific name honoured Swinburne Ward, the British civil commissioner to the Seychelles from 1862 to 1868. Ward had procured three skins of the bird from the island of Mahé (the largest island of the Seychelles), from which the species was described; these syntype specimens are catalogued as UMZC18/Psi/67/g/1-3 at the Cambridge University Museum of Zoology, and include two females and a male.

Newton did not find any birds on Mahé when he visited in 1866, but saw them on neighbouring Silhouette. Based on hearsay evidence, Newton stated they also lived on the island of Praslin. Newton and his brother, British ornithologist Alfred Newton, published an illustration depicting both sexes in 1876 by the Dutch artist John Gerrard Keulemans, based on subsequently received specimens. Keulemans' illustration of the species for the British zoologist Walter Rothschild's 1907 book Extinct Birds was based on his earlier illustration. Ten skin specimens exist today, but no skeletons, housed at Cambridge University, the Natural History Museum at Tring, the National Museum of Natural History, France, the American Museum of Natural History, and the Museum of Comparative Zoology at Harvard University.

=== Evolution ===
The American ornithologist James L. Peters used the name Psittacula wardi for the Seychelles parakeet in his 1937 checklist of birds, replacing the genus name Palaeornis with Psittacula, wherein he also classified other extant parakeets of Asia and Africa. The American ornithologist James Greenway stated in 1967 that while the Seychelles parakeet closely resembled the parrots of the Mascarene Islands, it belonged in the Asiatic group that lacks a rosy collar. He referred to it as Psittacula eupatria wardi, indicating it was a subspecies of the Alexandrine parakeet (Psittacula eupatria). Using the full species name Psittacula wardi in 1969, the Canadian ornithologist Rosemary Gaymer and colleagues also found the Seychelles parakeet most similar to the Alexandrine parakeet, and therefore concluded it had colonised from Asia rather than Madagascar or the Mascarenes. While the Australian ornithologist Joseph M. Forshaw listed the bird as a full species in 1973, the British writer Errol Fuller did not consider this justifiable in 2000.

In his 2007 monograph about Mascarene parrots, the British ornithologist Julian Hume also discussed the Seychelles parakeet, as it appeared to be closely linked to the colonisation of the Mascarenes by Psittacula species. Hume stated that the Seychelles are an ancient part of the landmass Gondwanaland, of which only their granitic mountain tops remain above sea level, and while it is now difficult to determine how the fauna changed since human colonisation, much of the bird fauna is little differentiated from that of the mainland at the genus level, and is of relatively recent origin. He considered the Seychelles bird a distinct species because of distinctive physical characters, but noted it was unknown how it was related to other members of Psittacula of the Indian Ocean region, since no fossil remains were available and no DNA studies had then been performed. He concluded that it and the Mascarene Psittacula species had a probable ancestor related to the Alexandrine parakeet, and that these islands became dead ends for parrot colonisation across the Indian Ocean because they did not continue further west. Forshaw accepted Hume's rationale for keeping the Seychelles parakeet as a separate species in 2017.

A 2011 DNA study by the British biologist Samit Kundu and colleagues included the Seychelles parakeet for the first time (using a footpad sample from a Cambridge specimen), and found it to be the first diverging lineage in a group consisting of Alexandrine parakeet subspecies. This indicated to them that Indian Ocean islands have been important stepping stones for evolutionary radiation of these species. They suggested that the ancestors of the Seychelles parakeet and other species may have colonised Asia and Africa via these islands rather than the other way around. In 2015, the British geneticist Hazel Jackson and colleagues found that the Seychelles parakeet was nested deeply within the Alexandrine parakeet group, and had diverged 3.83 million years ago, and also considered Indian Ocean islands to have played a key role in the radiation of the group. Because of its relation with the Alexandrine parakeet, they suggested that species could be used as a potential ecological replacement on the Seychelles.

In 2017, the German biologist Lars Podsiadlowski and colleagues found the Seychelles parakeet to be an early diverging member of a group including the extinct Mascarene parrot (Mascarinus mascarinus) and subspecies of the Alexandrine parakeet. The study also found that the parrots of the genus Tanygnathus were grouped among Psittacula parrots, and proposed that Tanygnathus and Mascarinus should therefore be merged into the genus Psittacula. The following cladograms show the phylogenetic position of the Seychelles parakeet according to Kundu and colleagues, 2011 (left), and Podsiadlowski and colleagues, 2017 (right):

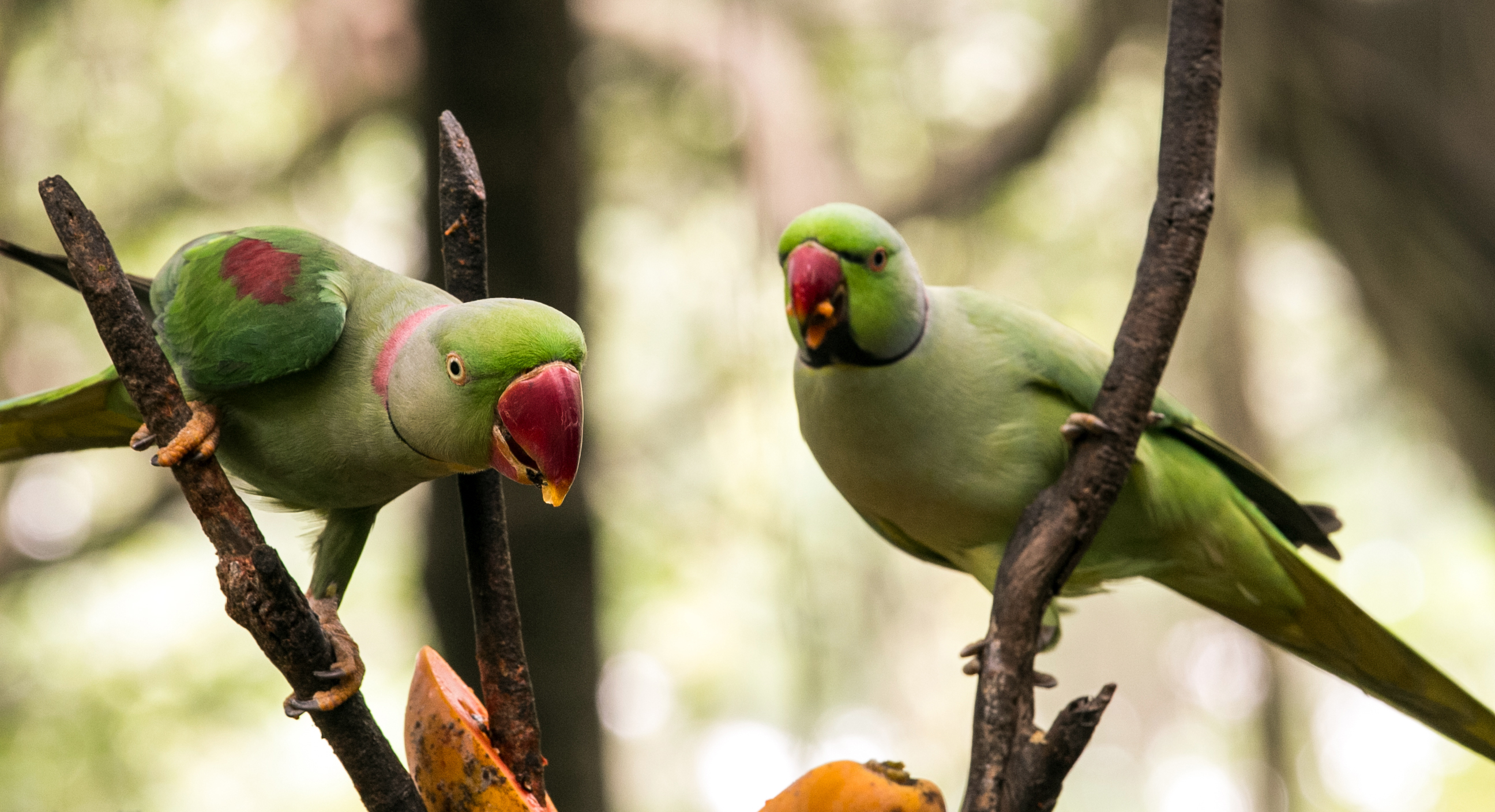
Two male Alexandrine parakeets. This species is the closest living relative of the Seychelles parakeet.

Kundu and colleagues, 2011:

- - - - - Psittacula eupatria nipalensis (Nepalese Alexandrine parakeet)
        - Psittacula eupatria eupatria (Alexandrine parakeet nominate subspecies)
      - Psittacula eupatria siamensis (Siamese Alexandrine parakeet)
    - Psittacula eupatria magnirostris (Andaman Islands Alexandrine parakeet)
  - Psittacula wardi (Seychelles parakeet)

Podsiadlowski and colleagues, 2017:

- - Mascarinus mascarinus (Mascarene parrot)
  - - Psittacula wardi (Seychelles parakeet)
    - - Psittacula eupatria nipalensis (Nepalese Alexandrine parakeet)
      - - Psittacula eupatria magnirostris (Andaman Islands Alexandrine parakeet)
        - Psittacula eupatria siamensis (Siamese Alexandrine parakeet)

In 2018, the American ornithologist Kaiya L. Provost and colleagues also found the Mascarene parrot and Tanygnathus species to form a group within Psittacula, making that genus paraphyletic (an unnatural grouping excluding some of its subgroups), and stated this argued for breaking up the latter genus. To solve the issue, the German ornithologist Michael P. Braun and colleagues proposed in 2016 and 2019 that Psittacula should be split into multiple genera. They placed the Seychelles parakeet in the reinstated genus Palaeornis, along with the Alexandrine parakeet.

A 2022 genetic study by the Brazilian ornithologist Alexandre P. Selvatti and colleagues confirmed the earlier studies in regard to the relationship between Psittacula, the Mascarene parrot, and Tanygnathus. They suggested that Psittaculinae originated in the Australo–Pacific region (then part of the supercontinent Gondwana), and that the ancestral population of the Psittacula–Mascarinus lineage were the first psittaculines in Africa by the late Miocene (8–5 million years ago), and colonised the Mascarenes from there.

== Description ==
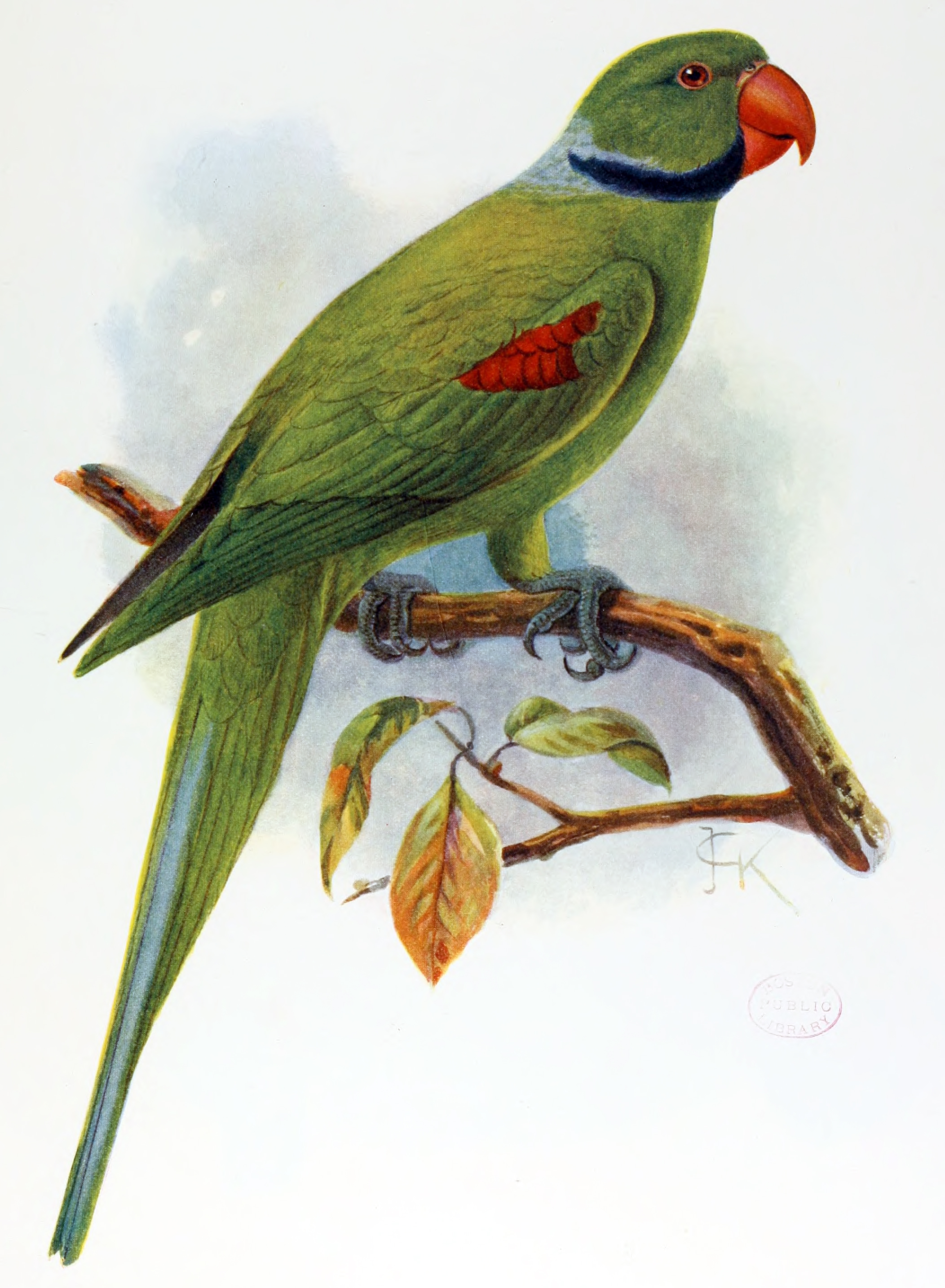
Illustration of a male, by Keulemans, 1907

The Seychelles parakeet was about 41 cm (16 in) in length, with a long, pointed tail. The wing of a male measured 204–208 mm (8.0–8.2 in), the tail 184–187 mm (7.2–7.4 in), the culmen (upper surface of the beak) 33–34 mm (1.3–1.3 in), and the tarsometatarsus (lower leg bone also known as tarsus) 22 mm (0.9 in). The wing of a female measured 182–204 mm (7.2–8.0 in), the tail 200–261 mm (7.9–10.3 in), the culmen 29–34 mm (1.1–1.3 in), and the tarsometatarsus 20–22 mm (0.8–0.9 in).

The male was generally green, slightly paler and more yellowish on the underparts, with the back of the head, nape, and narrow stripes on the cheeks washed with pale blue. It had a broad, black cheek-stripe (also termed a band or incomplete collar) and an obscure, narrow line from the cere (the bare patch around the nostrils) to the eye. The abdomen was yellowish green, and there was a purple-red or deep maroon patch (also termed a speculum) on the wing covert-feathers. The upper side of the central tail feathers was blue with yellow tips, the tail feathers on the sides were green, and the underside of the tail was yellow. The bill was red with a yellow tip, the iris was yellowish, and the feet were grey. The female lacked the black cheek-stripe, and the immature bird was similar to the female, but with shorter tail feathers.

The preserved specimens show that the Seychelles parakeet was smaller and had shorter wings, as well as a slightly less robust bill, than the Alexandrine parakeet. While all skeletal elements of the male Alexandrine parakeet were larger than those of the male Seychelles parakeet, an x-radiograph of a female Seychelles parakeet shows that it had a larger cranium, rostrum (upper jaw), mandible, ulna (a lower wing bone), and tibiotarsus (shin bone) than the female Alexandrine parakeet, but a shorter tarsometatarsus and carpometacarpus (outermost wing or hand bone). The male Seychelles parakeet differed from the male Alexandrine parakeet in lacking a rosy collar, in that the cheeks and back of the neck were suffused with blue instead of blue-grey, in that the black band that encircled the cheeks was finer, extending to the back of the neck, and in that its underside was more yellowish. The wings and tail were shorter and broader.

The British artist Marianne North worked on the Seychelles from 1883 to 1884, where she produced at least 46 paintings, mainly depicting botanical subjects, but also some animals. Apart from a few mentions, her animal paintings from the Seychelles were neglected in the literature until 2013, when the British ecologist Anthony S. Cheke discussed them in depth and identified the depicted species. Cheke found the paintings to be a useful snapshot of the local wildlife during the period, and he located and published for the first time an 1883 painting by North of the Seychelles parakeet, which had previously only been mentioned in writing. The depicted birds were a captive male and juvenile (shown with the tropical American plant Caesalpinia pulcherrima) that had been brought to Mahé from Silhouette, kept by the British medical officer James Brooks and his wife. It is the only known depiction of the species in life, and the appearance of the juvenile is only known from the painting. While unpublished, the painting was known from North's writings, such as an 1884 account describing the birds, the only mention of this species in captivity, and the painting was purchased by a relative of hers at an auction in the 1990s. The colours of this painting are more muted than North's other paintings from this time, perhaps because of fading resulting from experiencing different conditions.

== Behaviour and ecology ==
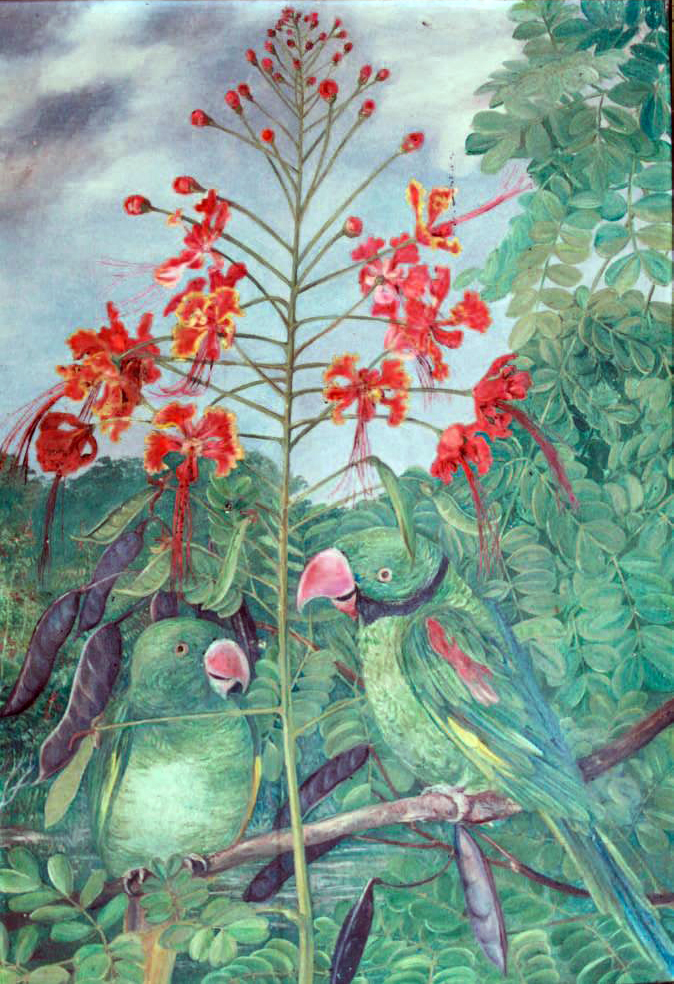
Only known depiction from life, showing a captive juvenile (left) and male, by Marianne North, 1883

Little is known about the habits of the Seychelles parakeet, but they were presumably similar to those of the Alexandrine parakeet, which associates in groups in forests and most wooded habitats, making daily flights, at considerable heights at times, between nighttime communal roost sites and feeding areas. The Seychelles parakeet lived in native forest, but as that was cleared, adapted to open, cultivated areas, and its diet included fruit. An 1820 account by the British surgeon James Prior stated they were "not remarkable for their imitative powers".

North's little known 1884 account of two captive birds she painted reads as follows:

I went one day to their house [a Doctor B and his wife], and painted their parrots, which came originally from Silhouette: queer, misshapen birds, with enormous beaks and patches of red and yellow badly put on, one of them having a black ring round its neck [male]. Both were quite helplessly bullied by common pigeons, which came and ate their food, while they jabbered in a melancholy way, and submitted. They had absolutely no tops to their heads, which perhaps accounted for their stupidity. They had a stand on the back verandah, where they slept and fed. They were not tied up, but went and stole their own fruit off the neighbouring trees.

Hume pointed out that the remarks about their "stupidity" was a reflection of their island tameness, and that the pigeons mentioned may have been Malagasy turtle doves (Nesoenas picturata).

== Extinction ==
The Seychelles were covered in thick forests when first described in 1609, and only inhabited by animals. They were settled by the French in 1768, and native forest was subsequently destroyed, which coincided with the decline of endemic birds and the success of introduced species. According to Prior, the Seychelles parakeet was considered abundant in 1811, but by 1867, Newton noted it had been almost exterminated because of its taste for maize:

The 'Cateau vert' [P. wardi], from the constant persecution against it brought on by its unfortunate partiality for ripe maize, was said to be nearly exterminated... The cocoa-nuts are now planted more than halfway up the mountain, and it is probable that in ten years none of the native forests will remain... and here we saw the 'Cateau vert' at the edge of the forest, in a place some 600 or 700 feet high, where was a patch of maize; but they had been so often fired at that they would not come within shot.

The Newton brothers stated in 1876 that the Seychelles parakeet and the Seychelles black parrot (Coracopsis barklyi) were decreasing in numbers because of the clearing of natural forest and replanting of coconuts, which these parrots did not feed on, and that they were doomed to extinction by being killed everywhere because of the damage they did to crops. Two specimens were collected by the British superintendent Henry Morris Warry in 1881, and the captive birds described by North in 1883 are the last known from Silhouette. The last record of the species is of a bird shot by the American explorer William Louis Abbott on Mahé in March of 1893. The British ornithologist Michael John Nicoll did not see them when he visited in 1906. In 1907, Rothschild said the bird was confined to the islet of Silhouette, where it would probably become extinct.

While the British ornithologist Desmond Vesey-Fitzgerald was unable to find birds in the 1930s (though he found a small population of the Seychelles black parrot on Praslin), Peters speculated in 1937 that they still survived on Silhouette. Greenway stated in 1967 that shooting and trapping would have been the primary causes of extinction, since Mahé rises almost 610 m (2,000 ft) straight up from the sea, and it would have been surprising if no forest had remained there, and as the island is only 27 km (17 mi) long by 8.0 km (5 mi) wide, he did not find it probable birds would be found there. In 2017, Hume considered the species highly unlikely to have survived past 1906. Forshaw stated in 2017 that the species probably disappeared some time after the last specimen was collected in 1893 and before Nicoll's 1906 visit when no birds were reported.
