= Pierre Pfeffer =

Pierre Pfeffer (6 December 1927 – 29 December 2016) was a French naturalist, conservationist and zoologist who headed the National Museum of Natural History in Paris. He was a noted popularizer of natural history and a campaigner for elephant conservation who worked to stop the trade in ivory.

Pierre was born in Paris to journalists Pfeffer and Marie Beylin. His mother was of Russian and Polish origins who moved to Eastern Europe when he was a young child after his father was killed in the war. The young Pfeffer grew up in Germany, Poland and USSR, learning multiple languages. In 1937 the family returned to France where he went to study in Les Minimes, Lyon. He joined the Free French Forces in Ardeche and served in the Rhone valley and Alsace where he also became interested in alpine wildlife. He returned to civilian life in 1947 and went to study veterinary medicine. In the early 1950s he was invited by friends in Africa to visit them in the Ivory Coast. Here he took an interest in African wildlife. On his way back aboard ship he met a botanist who later introduced him to Jacques Berlioz in Paris. Berlioz offered Pfeffer a position as animal collector on an expedition to Borneo in 1956 with film maker Georges Bourdelon. Here he became interested in the Komodo dragon and on his return published a book on his travels. He then worked on a doctoral thesis studying mouflon in Corsica under François Bourlière. An attempt to bring animals from India to the Vincennes zoo in France that involved losses of animals en route led him to change his views on zoos, later even campaigning against them. He became a popular figure in France after he produced a television series on the animals of the world started by François de La Grange with fellow presenter Antoine Reille from 1969 to 1975. He was the President of WWF France from 1976 and 1983 (resigning due to difference over the position on ivory trade) and was involved in establishing national parks both in France (in Mercantour, Caroux and Corsica) and in other parts of the world (Taï National Park in Cote d'Ivorie, Cambodia).
