= François de La Grange =

French journalist (1920–1976)

- Born: François Louis Georges de La Grange; 20 August 1920; 15th arrondissement of Paris
- Died: 3 March 1976 (aged 55); Kahuzi-Biéga National Park (Zaire)
- Resting place

François Louis Georges de La Grange, born on August 20, 1920, in Paris and died of a heart attack on March 3, 1976, in Bukavu (Congo-Kinshasa, then "Zaire"), was a French journalist and television producer.

== Biography ==
François de La Grange became the editorial secretary of La Nouvelle République du Centre-Ouest in Tours in 1954, and then of Radio Brazzaville the following year. He is chief editor at Radio-Abidjan from 1954, and then of the Société de radiodiffusion d'outre-mer Sorafom from 1958. The same year he became a political commentator at the Office de Radiodiffusion Télévision Française. He presented the News program from 1959 to 1968. From 1963 to 1968, he was also the chief editor of the news program and general secretary for current affairs, and finally deputy to the head of the television documentary service from 1968 to 1969.

Starting in 1967, he launched the show Voyages et aventures, which consisted of a first part with reported on animals, and a second part with travel reports. In 1969, the animal section of Voyages et aventures became its own show, Les Animaux du monde. The concept of the show was to make zoological science accessible to the general public and bring the zoo into French homes through the television screen. The show, broadcast twice a month on Télévision française's second "color" channel, was presented by François de La Grange, Marie-Josée Neuville, or Marlyse Lowenbach (his second wife). Commentary for the show was provided by a dedicated team of animal specialists: Francis Petter, deputy director at the National Museum of Natural History in Paris, Pierre Pfeffer, research associate at CNRS, Antoine Reille, teaching assistant at the Faculty of Sciences in Paris, and Michel Klein, veterinarian.

With Antoine Reille, he was one of the founders in 1969 of the association des journalistes-écrivains pour la nature et l'écologie (JNE). He became deputy president of the Ligue pour la protection des oiseaux (LPO) in 1971.

François de La Grange is buried at the cemetery of Brazey-en-Morvan in Côte-d'Or.

== Awards ==
- 1971: Prix Grammont from the Société Protectrice des Animaux

== Works ==
(Several volumes have been reissued and updated through the early 1980s)

- François de La Grange, Les Animaux du monde, Published by Fernand Nathan, Paris, 1969.
- François de La Grange & Antoine Reille, Les Oiseaux du monde, Éditions Fernand Nathan, Paris, 1970.
- François et Marlyse de La Grange, Chiens et chats du monde, Éditions Fernand Nathan, Paris, 1971.
- François de La Grange & Antoine Reille, Animaux et réserves de France, Éditions Fernand Nathan, Paris, 1972.
- François de La Grange, Les Félins, Éditions Fernand Nathan, Paris, 1972.
- François de La Grange, Les Animaux en péril, Éditions Fernand Nathan, Paris, 1973.
- François de La Grange, Les Animaux de la mer, Éditions Fernand Nathan, Paris, 1973.
- François de La Grange & Antoine Reille, L'Homme et la nature, Éditions Fernand Nathan, Paris, 1974.
- François de La Grange, Les Singes, Éditions Fernand Nathan, Paris, 1974.
- François de La Grange & Michel Châteauneuf, Le grand livre des oiseaux de cage et de volière, Éditions Fernand Nathan, Paris, 1974.
- François de La Grange & Jacques Tondra, Le Cheval, Éditions Fernand Nathan, Paris, 1975.
- François de La Grange & Antoine Reille, Les Oiseaux et leurs secrets, Éditions Fernand Nathan, Paris, 1975.
- François de La Grange & Jean Larivière, Animaux extraordinaires, Éditions Fernand Nathan, Paris, 1975.
- François de La Grange & Jean Larivière, Le Monde sauvage des Montagnes rocheuses, Éditions Fernand Nathan, Paris, 1976.

== Tributes ==
The book Le Monde mystérieux des gorilles was published in 1977 by Jean Larivière as a tribute to François de La Grange's last adventure.

The journalist's name was given to a college in Liernais in Côte-d'Or.
