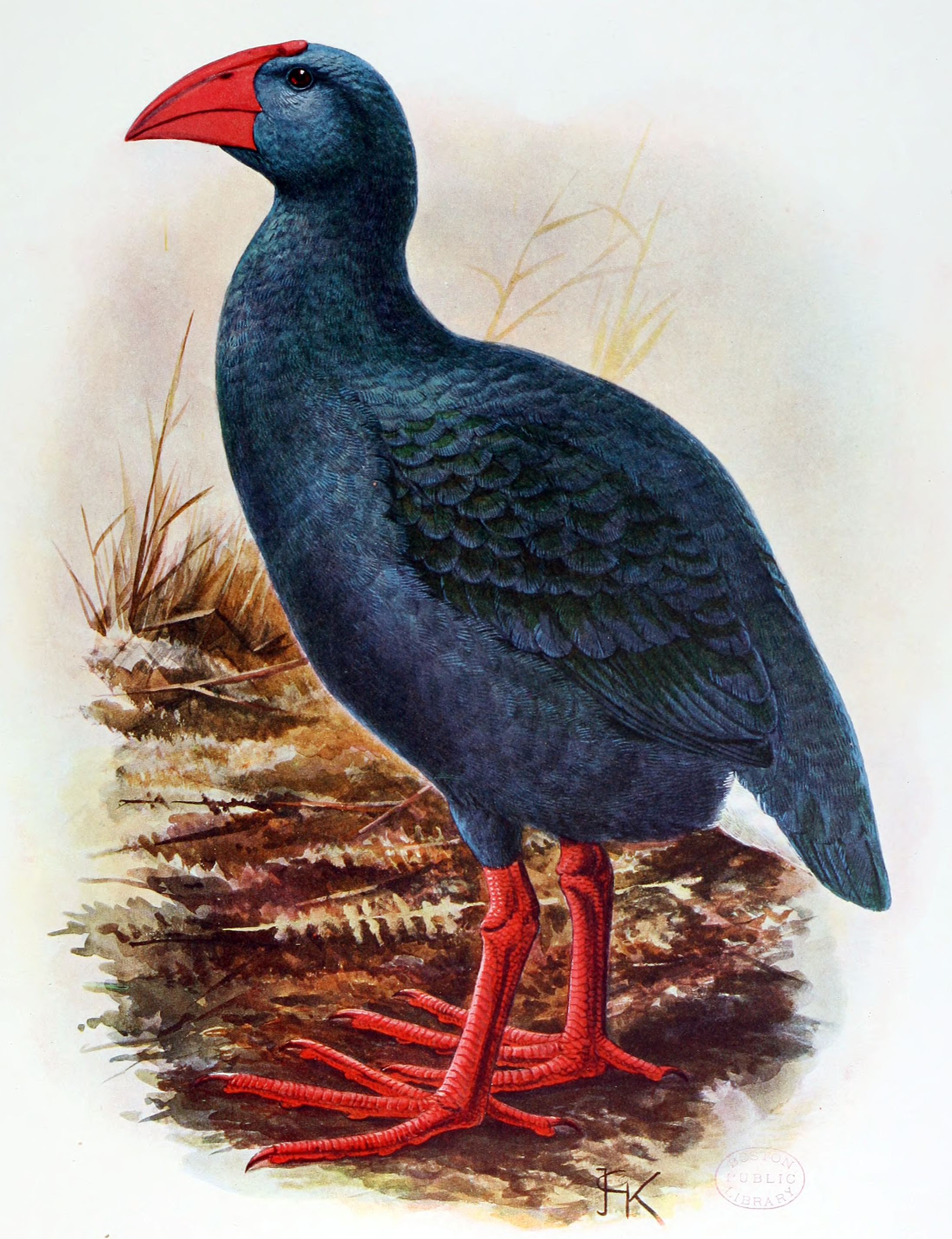
- Hypothetical reconstruction by John Gerrard Keulemans, 1907

Conservation status
- Extinct (c. 1730) (IUCN 3.1)

Scientific classification
- Kingdom: Animalia
- Phylum: Chordata
- Class: Aves
- Order: Gruiformes
- Family: Rallidae
- Genus: Porphyrio
- Species: †P. caerulescens

Binomial name
- †Porphyrio caerulescens (Selys Longchamps, 1848)
- Location of Réunion (encircled)

Synonyms
- List: Apterornis coerulescens Selys Longchamps, 1848; Cyanornis erythrorhynchus Bonaparte, 1857; Porphyrio (Notornis) coerulescens Schlegel, 1857; Porphyrio coerulescens Sharpe, 1894; Cyanornis coerulescens Hachisuka, 1953; Cyanornis (Porphyrio) caerulescens Mourer-Chauviré et al., 2006

= Réunion swamphen =

Hypothetical extinct species of bird

The Réunion swamphen (Porphyrio caerulescens), also known as the Réunion gallinule or oiseau bleu (French for "blue bird"), is a hypothetical extinct species of rail that was endemic to the Mascarene island of Réunion. While only known from 17th- and 18th-century accounts by visitors to the island, it was scientifically named in 1848, based on the 1674 account by Sieur Dubois. A considerable literature was subsequently devoted to its possible affinities, with current researchers agreeing it was derived from the swamphen genus Porphyrio. It has been considered mysterious and enigmatic due to the lack of any physical evidence of its existence.

This bird was described as entirely blue in plumage with a red beak and legs. It was said to be the size of a Réunion ibis or chicken, which could mean 65–70 cm (26–28 in) in length, and it may have been similar to the takahē. While easily hunted, it was a fast runner and able to fly, though it did so reluctantly. It may have fed on plant matter and invertebrates, as do other swamphens, and was said to nest among grasses and aquatic ferns. It was only found on the Plaine des Cafres plateau, to which it may have retreated during the latter part of its existence, whereas other swamphens inhabit lowland swamps. While the last unequivocal account is from 1730, it may have survived until 1763, but overhunting and the introduction of cats likely drove it to extinction.

== Taxonomy ==
Visitors to the Mascarene island of Réunion during the 17th and 18th centuries reported blue birds (oiseaux bleus in French). The first such account is that of the French traveller Sieur Dubois, who was on Réunion from 1669 to 1672, which was published in 1674. The British naturalist Hugh Edwin Strickland stated in 1848 that he would have thought Dubois' account referred to a member of the swamphen genus Porphyrio if not for its large size and other features (and noted the term oiseau bleu had also been erroneously used for bats on Réunion in an old account). Strickland expressed hope that remains of this and other extinct Mascarene birds would be found there. Responding to Strickland's book later that year, the Belgian scientist Edmond de Sélys Longchamps coined the scientific name Apterornis coerulescens based on Dubois' account. The specific name is Latin for "bluish, becoming blue". Sélys Longchamps also included two other Mascarene birds, at the time only known from contemporary accounts, in the genus Apterornis: the Réunion ibis (now Threskiornis solitarius); and the red rail (now Aphanapteryx bonasia). He thought them related to the dodo and Rodrigues solitaire, due to their shared rudimentary wings, tail, and the disposition of their digits.

The name Apterornis had already been used for a different extinct bird genus from New Zealand (originally spelled Aptornis, the adzebills) by the British biologist Richard Owen earlier in 1848, and the French biologist Charles Lucien Bonaparte coined the new binomial Cyanornis erythrorhynchus for the oiseau bleu in 1857. The same year, the German ornithologist Hermann Schlegel moved the species to the genus Porphyrio, as P. (Notornis) caerulescens, indicating an affinity with the takahē (now called Porphyrio hochstetteri, then also referred to as Notornis by some authors) of New Zealand. Schlegel argued that the discovery of the takahē showed that members of Porphyrio could be large, thereby disproving Strickland's earlier doubts based on size. The British ornithologist Richard Bowdler Sharpe simply used the name Porphyrio caerulescens in 1894. The British zoologist Walter Rothschild retained the name Apterornis for the bird in 1907, and considered it similar to Aptornis and the takahē, believing Dubois's account indicated it was related to those birds. The Japanese ornithologist Masauji Hachisuka used the new combination Cyanornis coerulescens for the bird in 1953 (with the specific name misspelled), also considering it related to the takahē due to its size.

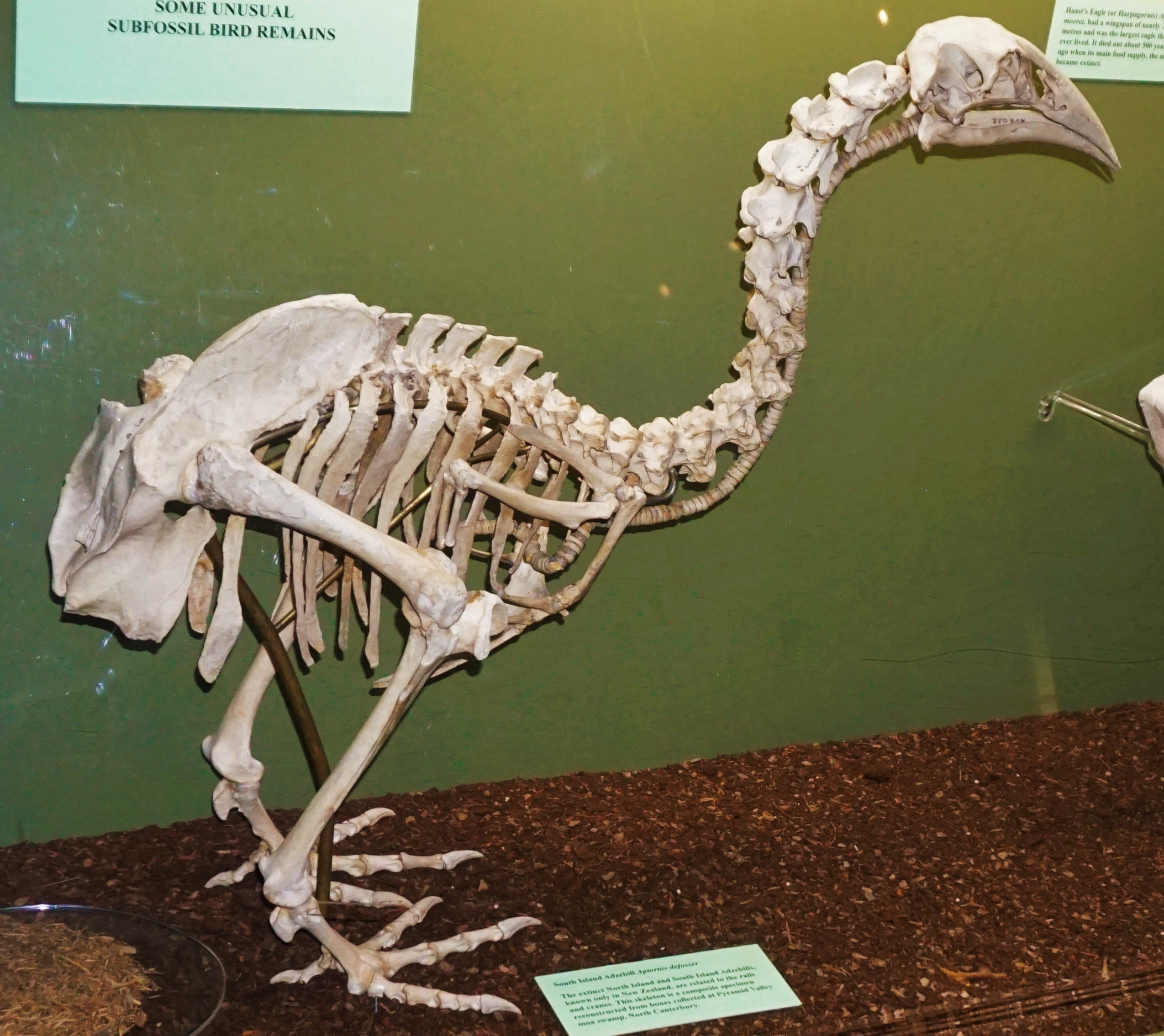
The original genus name of the Réunion swamphen, Apterornis, was already used for the extinct Aptornis, which Walter Rothschild later believed to have been a relative.

Throughout the 20th century the bird was usually considered a member of Porphyrio or Notornis, and the latter genus was eventually itself considered a junior synonym of Porphyrio. Some writers equated the bird with extant swamphens, including African swamphens by the French ornithologist Jacques Berlioz in 1946, and western swamphens by the French ornithologist Nicolas Barré in 1996, despite their different habitat. The French ornithologist Philippe Milon doubted the Porphyrio affiliation in 1951, since Dubois's account stated the Réunion bird was palatable, while extant swamphens are not. In 1967, the American ornithologist James Greenway stated that the bird "must remain mysterious" until Porphyrio bones are one day uncovered.

In 1974, an attempt was made to find fossil localities on the Plaine des Cafres plateau, where the bird was said to have lived. No caves, which might contain kitchen middens where early settlers discarded bones of local birds, were found, and it was determined that a more careful study of the area was needed before excavations could be made. In 1977, the American ornithologist Storrs L. Olson found the old accounts consistent with an endemic derivative of Porphyrio, and considered it a probable species whose remains might one day be discovered. The British ecologist Anthony S. Cheke considered previous arguments about the bird's affinities in 1987, and supported it being a Porphyrio relative, while noting that there were two further contemporary accounts. The same year, the British writer Errol Fuller listed the bird as a hypothetical species, and expressed puzzlement as to how a considerable literature had been derived from such "flimsy material".

The French palaeontologist Cécile Mourer-Chauviré and colleagues listed the bird as Cyanornis (?=Porphyrio) caerulescens in 2006, indicating the uncertainty of its classification. They stated the cause of the scarcity of its fossil remains was probably that it did not live in the parts of Réunion where fossils might have been preserved. Cheke and the British palaeontologist Julian P. Hume stated in 2008 that, since the mystery of the "Réunion solitaire" had been solved after it was identified with ibis remains, the Réunion swamphen remains the most enigmatic of the Mascarene birds from the old accounts. In his 2012 book about extinct birds and his 2019 monograph about extinct Mascarene rails, Hume stated that the Réunion swamphen had been mentioned by trustworthy observers, but was "perhaps the most enigmatic of all rails" with no evidence to resolve its taxonomy. He thought there was no doubt that it was a derivative of Porphyrio, as the all-blue colouration is only found in that genus among rails. While it may have been derived from Africa or Madagascar, genetic studies have shown that other rails have dispersed to unexpectedly great distances from their closest relatives, making alternative explanations possible.

== Description ==
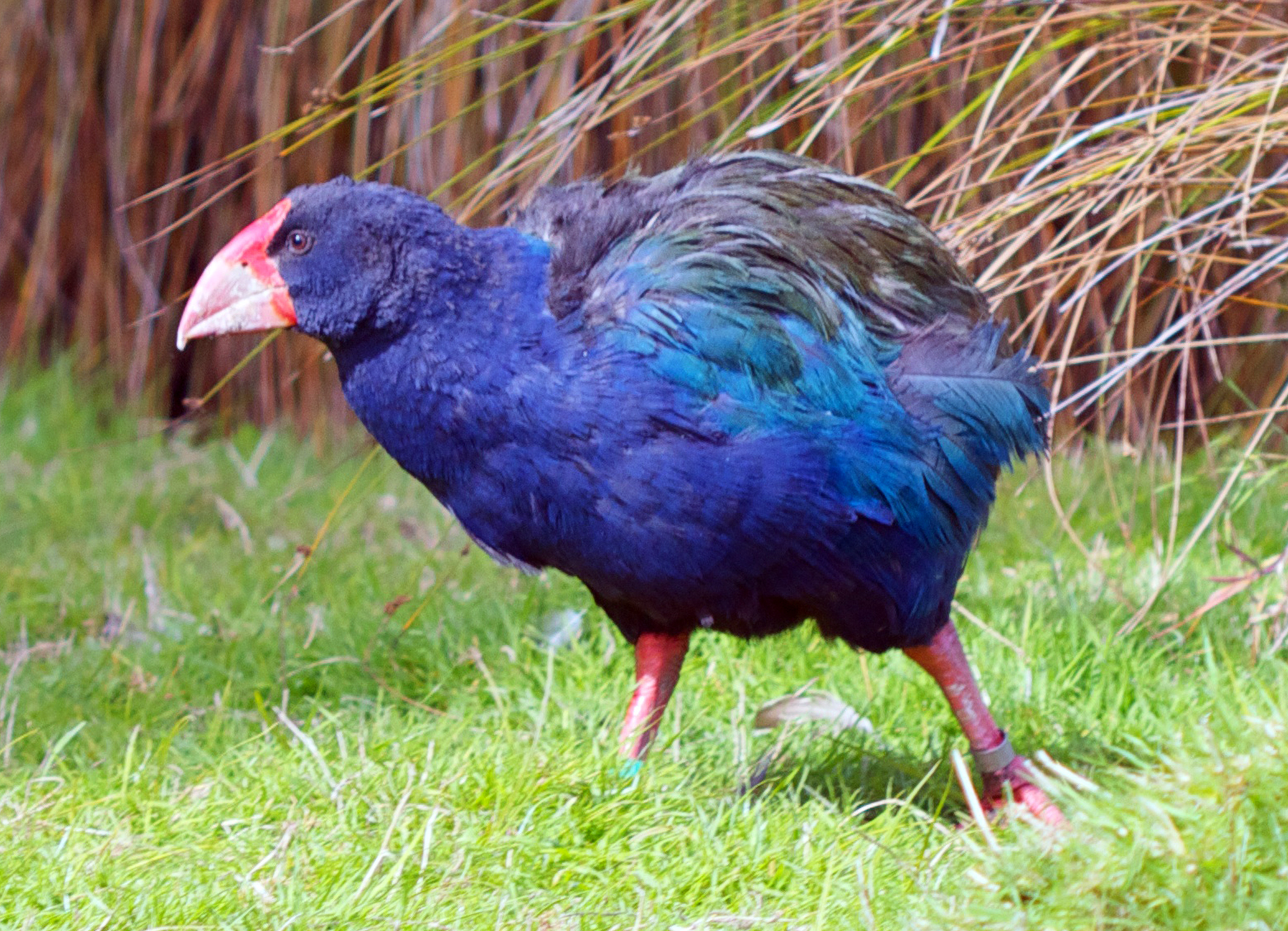
The Réunion swamphen was possibly similar to the takahē, and was at times thought to be closely related.

The Réunion swamphen was described as having entirely blue plumage with a red beak and legs, and is generally agreed to have been a large, terrestrial swamphen, with features indicative of reduced flight capability, such as larger size and more robust legs. There has been disagreement over the size of the bird, as Dubois' account compared its size with that of a Réunion ibis while that of the French engineer Jean Feuilley from 1704 compared it to a domestic chicken. Cheke stated in 1987 that Feuilley's account would indicate the bird was not unusually large, perhaps the size of a swamphen. Hume pointed out in 2019 that the Réunion ibis would have been 65–68 cm (26–27 in) at most, similar to the extant African sacred ibis (including the tail), while chickens could be 65–70 cm (26–28 in) in length (the size of their ancestor, the wild red junglefowl), and there was therefore no contradiction. The Réunion swamphen would thereby have been about the same size as the takahē.

The first description of the Réunion swamphen is that of Dubois from 1674:

As big as the solitaires [Réunion ibis]; their plumage is entirely blue, the beak and the feet red and made like those of hens; they do not fly, but run extremely quickly, so that a dog has difficulty catching them in a chase; they are very good [to eat].

The last definite account of the bird is that of the priest Father Brown from around 1730 (expanded from a 1717 account by Le Gentil):

Towards the east of the island there is a little plateau up a high mountain called the Plaine des Cafres where one finds a large blue bird whose colour is very striking. It resembles a wood-pigeon. It flies but rarely and always barely above the ground, but it walks with surprising speed. The inhabitants have never called it anything other than oiseau bleu; its flesh is quite good and keeps well.

Olson stated the comparison to a "wood pigeon" was a reference to the common wood pigeon, implying that Brown described it as smaller than Dubois did, while Hume suggested it could be the extinct Réunion blue pigeon. The 1708 account of Hébert does not add much information, though he qualified its colouration as "dark blue".

While the bird is only known from written accounts, reconstructions of it appear in Rothschild's 1907 book Extinct Birds, and Hachisuka's 1953 book The Dodo and Kindred Birds. Rothschild stated he had the Dutch artist John Gerrard Keulemans depict it as intermediate between the takahē and Aptornis, which he thought its closest relatives. Fuller found Keulemans's illustration to be a well-produced work, though almost entirely conjectural in depicting it like a slimmed-down takahē.

== Behaviour and ecology ==
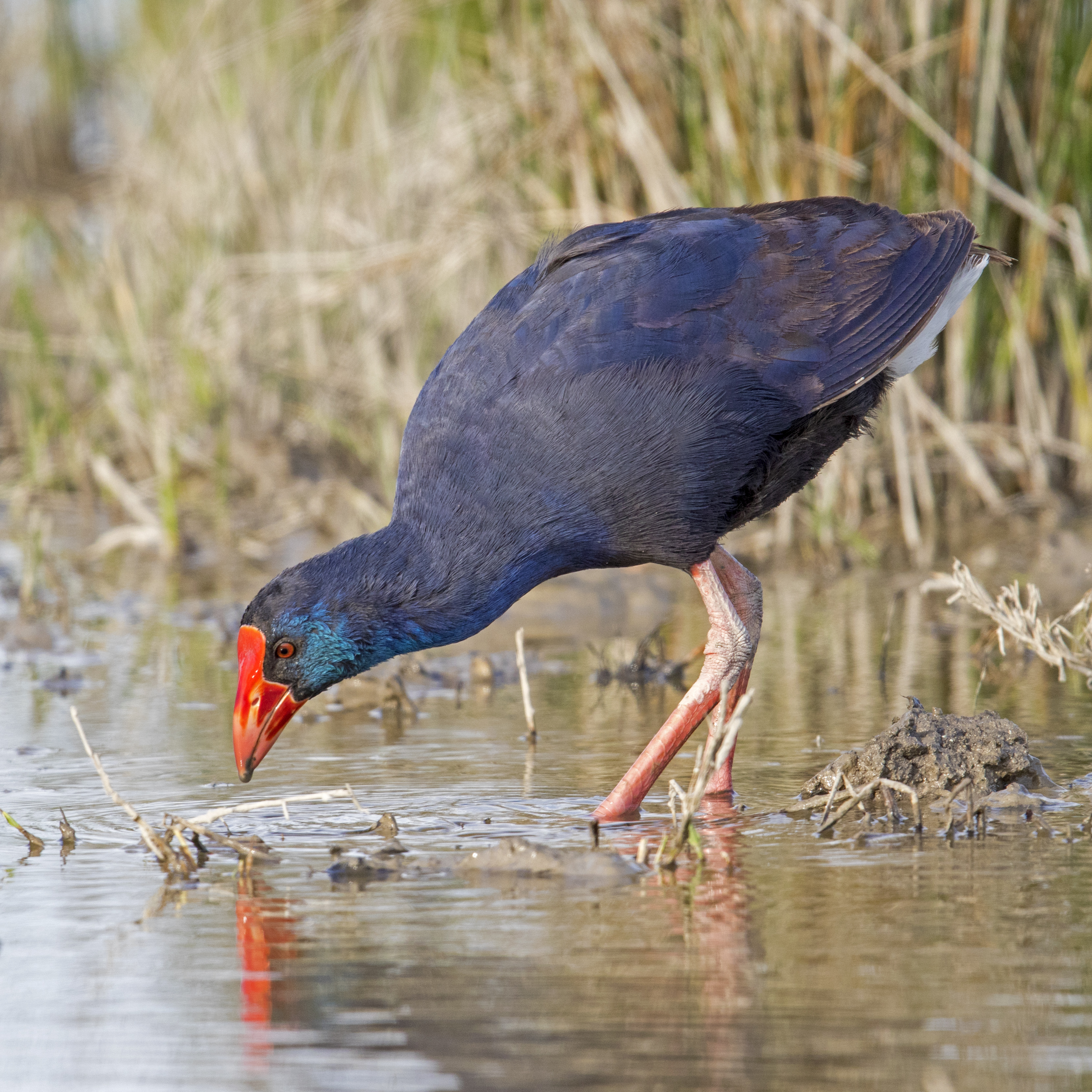
While it was probably derived from swamphens (here, a western swamphen), the Réunion swamphen did not inhabit swamps like them.

Little is known about the ecology of the Réunion swamphen; it was easily caught and killed, unlike other swamphens (which avoid predators by flying or hiding), though it was able to run fast. While some early researchers thought the bird to be flightless, Brown's account states it could fly, and it is thought to have been a reluctant flier. Hume suggested it may have fed on plant matter and invertebrates, as other swamphens do. At least in the latter part of its existence, it appears to have been confined to mountains (retreating there between the 1670s and 1705), in particular to the Plaine des Cafres plateau, situated at an altitude of about 1,600–1,800 m (5,200–5,900 ft) in south-central Réunion. The environment of this area consists of open woodland in a subalpine forest steppe, and has marshy pools.

The Réunion swamphen was termed a land-bird by Dubois, while other swamphens inhabit lowland swamps. This is similar to the Réunion ibis, which lived in forest rather than wetlands, which is otherwise typical ibis habitat. Cheke and Hume proposed that the ancestors of these birds colonised Réunion before swamps had developed, and had therefore become adapted to the available habitats. They were perhaps prevented from colonising Mauritius as well due to the presence of red rails there, which may have occupied a similar ecological niche.

Feuilley described some characteristics of the bird in 1704:

The Oiseaux bleuff live in the plaines on top of the mountains, and especially on the Plaine des Cafres. They are the size of a large capon, blue in colour. Those that are old are worth nothing to eat because they are so tough, but when they are young they are excellent. Hunting them is not difficult because one kills them with sticks or with stones.

The only account of its nesting behaviour is that of La Roque from 1708:

One sees there [the Plaines de Cafres] a great number of oiseaux bleus which nest among grasses and aquatic ferns.

Many other endemic species on Réunion became extinct after the arrival of humans and the resulting disruption of the island's ecosystem. The Réunion swamphen lived alongside other now-extinct birds, such as the Réunion ibis, the Mascarene parrot, the Hoopoe starling, the Réunion parakeet, the Réunion scops owl, the Réunion night heron, and the Réunion pink pigeon. Extinct Réunion reptiles include the Réunion giant tortoise and an undescribed Leiolopisma skink. The small Mauritian flying fox and the snail Tropidophora carinata lived on Réunion and Mauritius before vanishing from both islands.

== Extinction ==
Many terrestrial rails are flightless, and island populations are particularly vulnerable to man-made changes; as a result, rails have suffered more extinctions than any other family of birds. All six endemic species of Mascarene rails are extinct, all caused by human activities. Overhunting was the main cause of the Réunion swamphen's extinction (it was considered good game and was easy to catch), but according to Cheke and Hume, the introduction of cats at the end of the 17th century could have contributed to the elimination of the bird once these became feral and reached its habitat. Today, cats are still a serious threat to native birds, in particular Barau's petrel, since they occur all over Réunion, including the most remote and high peaks. The eggs and chicks would also have been vulnerable to rats after their accidental introduction in 1676. On the other hand, the Réunion swamphen and other birds of the island appear to have successfully survived feral pigs. Cattle grazing on Plaine des Cafres was promoted by the French explorer Jean-Baptiste Charles Bouvet de Lozier in the 1750s, which may have also had an impact on the bird.

While the last unequivocal account of the Réunion swamphen is from 1730, an anonymous account from 1763, possibly by the British Brigadier-General Richard Smith, may be the last mention of this bird, though no description of it was provided, and it might refer to another species. It is also impossible to say whether this writer saw the bird himself. It gives a contemporary impression of the Réunion swamphen's habitat, Plaine des Cafres, and of how birds were hunted there:

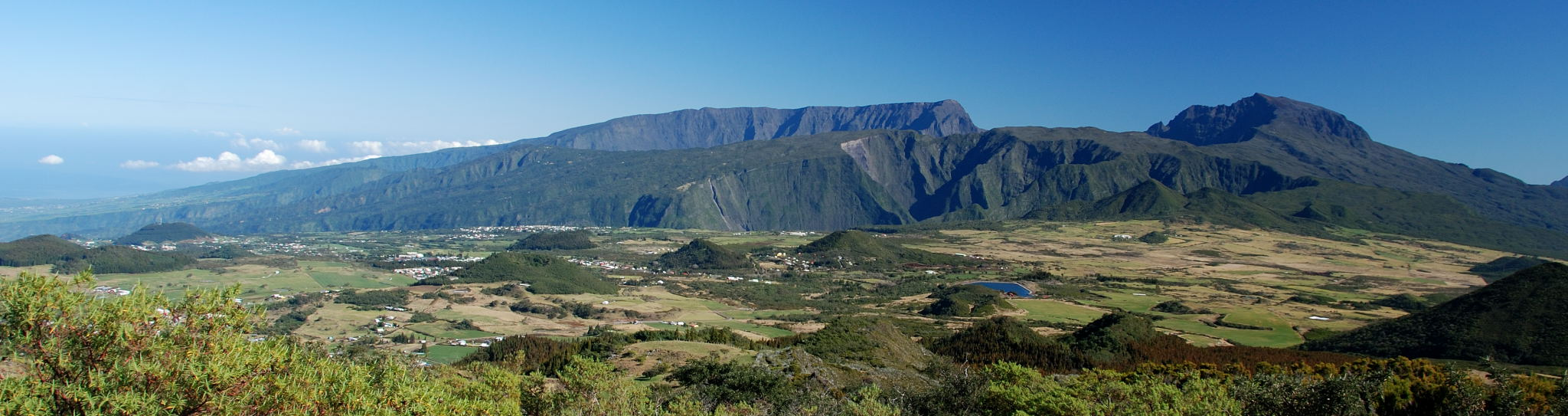
View of Plaine des Cafres, the only place this bird was said to live

The plain des Caffres, is formed by the summits of mountains at a very considerable elevation above the sea: it is said to be twenty miles in extent, and is very flat, and without stones. The access to it is very difficult in certain places, though it may be ascended on horseback. The air is very pure, but as cold as winter's day in England. When the clouds pass over the surface of the plain, they have all the effect of a gentle rain. A brook runs through the middle of it, which is broad but shallow, has a sandy bottom, and freezes in the winter.... There are also some curious birds, which never descend to the sea-side, and who are so little accustomed to, or alarmed at, the sight of man, that they suffer themselves to be killed by the stroke of a walking stick.

If the Réunion swamphen survived until 1763 this would be far longer than many other extinct birds of Réunion. If so, its survival was likely because of the remoteness of its habitat.

== See also ==
- List of extinct animals of Réunion
