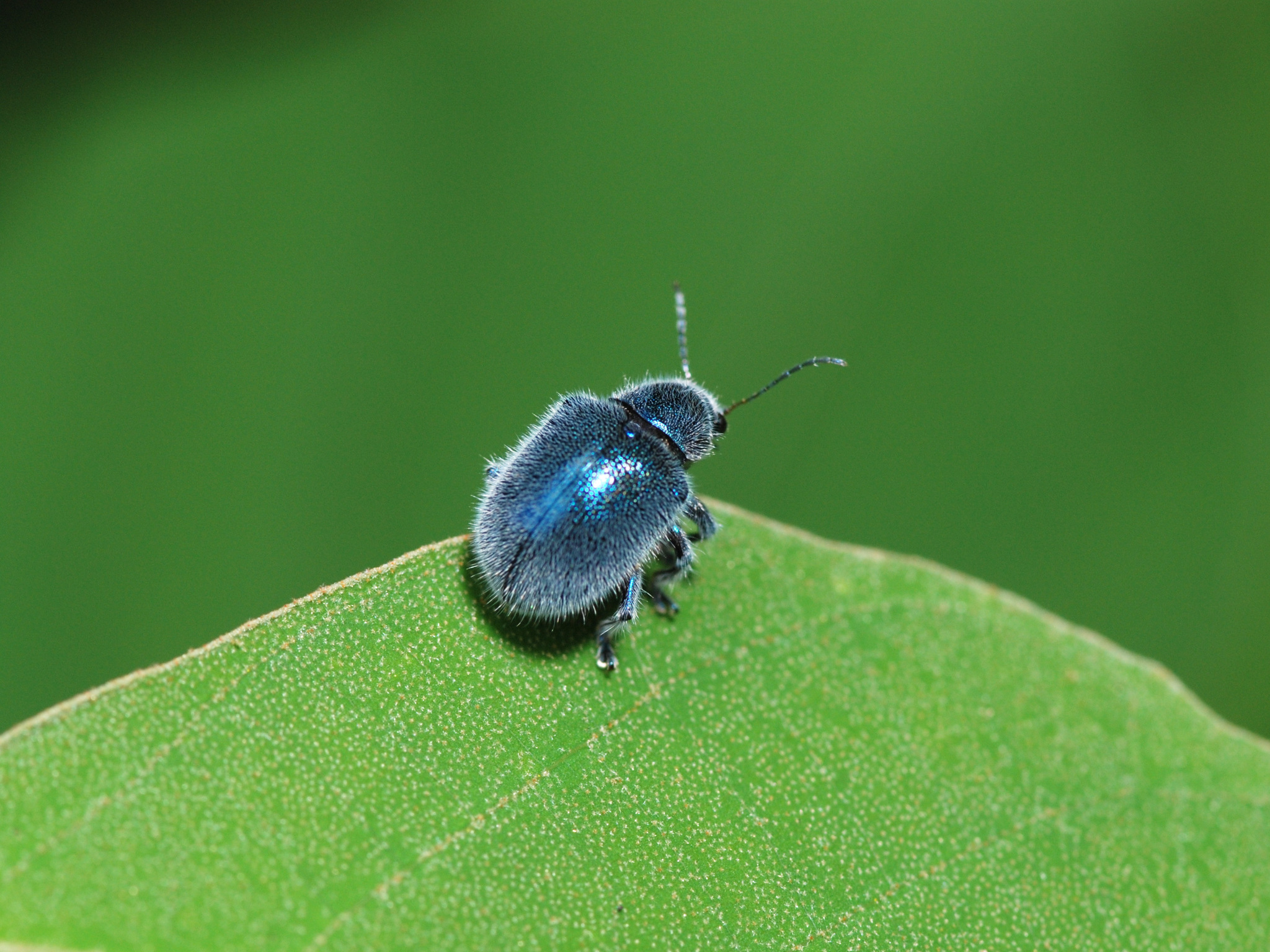
- Trichochrysea hirta, Singapore
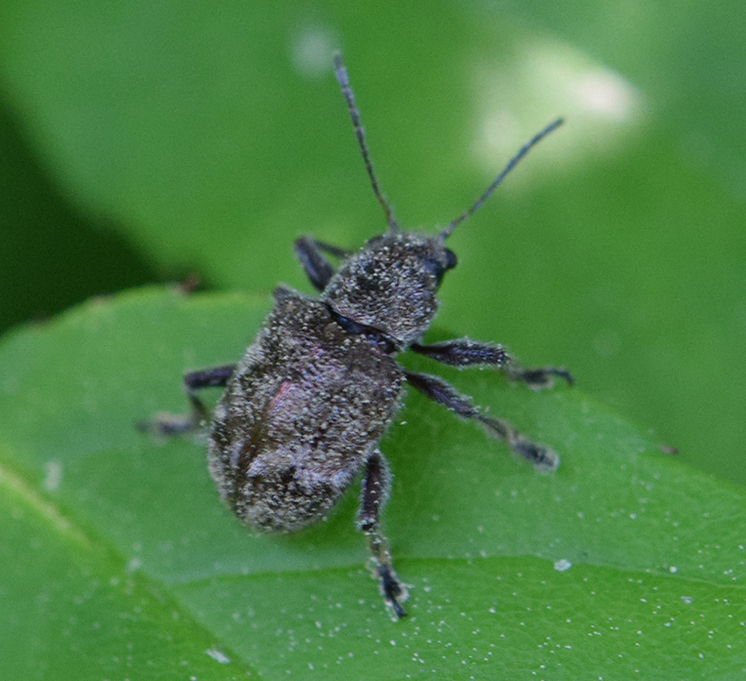
- Trichochrysea japana, South Korea

Scientific classification
- Kingdom: Animalia
- Phylum: Arthropoda
- Clade: Pancrustacea
- Class: Insecta
- Order: Coleoptera
- Suborder: Polyphaga
- Infraorder: Cucujiformia
- Family: Chrysomelidae
- Subfamily: Eumolpinae
- Tribe: Bromiini
- Genus: Trichochrysea; Baly, 1861

Type species
- Trichochrysea mouhoti Baly, 1861

Synonyms
- Bromius Baly, 1865 (not Chevrolat in Dejean, 1836); Heteraspis Chapuis, 1874 (not Chevrolat in Dejean, 1836); Lefevrella Jacobson, 1894; Heteraspibrachis Pic, 1907

= Trichochrysea =

Genus of leaf beetles

Trichochrysea is a genus of leaf beetles in the subfamily Eumolpinae. It is distributed in Asia.

According to A. G. Moseyko (in 2012), the Central Asian species are significantly different from the Oriental species.

== Species ==
The genus includes the following species:

South, East and Southeast Asian species:

- Trichochrysea aeneipennis (Lefèvre, 1890) – Southwestern China (Guizhou), Vietnam
- Trichochrysea albopilosa Medvedev & Eroshkina, 1987 – Vietnam
- Trichochrysea annamita (Lefèvre, 1877) – Southern China (Guangdong, Hong Kong), Vietnam
- Trichochrysea antennata Jacoby, 1908 – Eastern India (West Bengal: Darjeeling), Myanmar
- Trichochrysea bhamoensis (Jacoby, 1892) – Myanmar
- Trichochrysea bidens (Lefèvre, 1893) – Thailand, Laos, Vietnam
- Trichochrysea borneensis (Jacoby, 1895) – Borneo
- Trichochrysea brevipennis Pic, 1926 – Borneo
- Trichochrysea cephalotes (Lefèvre, 1893) – Vietnam
- Trichochrysea chejudoana Komiya, 1985 – South Korea
- Trichochrysea chihtuana Komiya, 1985 – Taiwan
- Trichochrysea clypeata (Jacoby, 1889) – Southwestern China (Yunnan), Myanmar, Vietnam
- Trichochrysea cupreata (Baly, 1867) – Singapore
- Trichochrysea curta Pic, 1926 – Thailand, Laos, Vietnam
- Trichochrysea evanescens (Baly, 1864) – Peninsular Malaysia, Sumatra, Borneo
- Trichochrysea fasciata Chen, 1940 – Vietnam
- Trichochrysea formosana Komiya, 1985 – Taiwan
- Trichochrysea fortipunctata Lopatin, 2005 – Nepal
- Trichochrysea grisea Medvedev & Eroshkina, 1999 – Thailand
- Trichochrysea hebe (Baly, 1864) – Southwestern China (Yunnan), Myanmar, Thailand, Laos, Vietnam
- Trichochrysea hirta (Fabricius, 1801)
  - Trichochrysea hirta hirta (Fabricius, 1801) – Indonesia, Peninsular Malaysia
  - Trichochrysea hirta viridis (Jacoby, 1892) – Central and Southern China, India, Myanmar, Thailand
- Trichochrysea igneipennis (Lefèvre, 1890) – Timor
- Trichochrysea imperialis (Baly, 1861) – Central and Southern China, Vietnam
- Trichochrysea inaequalis Pic, 1927 – Laos, Vietnam
- Trichochrysea incana Medvedev & Eroshkina, 1987 – Vietnam
- Trichochrysea jacobyi Medvedev, 2000 – Myanmar
- Trichochrysea japana (Motschulsky, 1858) – Japan, China, South Korea
- Trichochrysea lameyi (Lefèvre, 1893) – Southern China (Hainan), Vietnam
- Trichochrysea lesnei (Berlioz, 1921) – Southern China (Guizhou, Zhejiang)
- Trichochrysea mandarina (Lefèvre, 1893) – Southwestern China (Yunnan), Thailand, Laos, Vietnam
- Trichochrysea marmorata Tan, 1984 – Southwestern China (Yunnan)
- Trichochrysea morosa (Lefèvre, 1885) – Thailand
- Trichochrysea mouhoti Baly, 1861 – Southwestern China (Yunnan), Thailand, Cambodia, Laos, Vietnam
- Trichochrysea multicolor Pic, 1926 – Thailand, Laos, Vietnam
- Trichochrysea nitidissima (Jacoby, 1888)
  - Trichochrysea nitidissima nitidissima (Jacoby, 1888) – Southern China, Nepal, Vietnam
  - Trichochrysea nitidissima scutellaris Pic, 1926 – Vietnam, Laos, Cambodia, Thailand, Myanmar, Bangladesh, India, Nepal
- Trichochrysea okinawana Nakane, 1956
  - Trichochrysea okinawana meridiojaponica Komiya, 1985 – Japan
  - Trichochrysea okinawana okinawana Nakane, 1956 – Ryukyu Islands
  - Trichochrysea okinawana taiwana Komiya, 1985 – Taiwan
- Trichochrysea parvula (Jacoby, 1892) – Myanmar
- Trichochrysea philippinensis (Baly, 1864) – Philippines
- Trichochrysea purpureomaculata Jacoby, 1898 – India, Myanmar
- Trichochrysea purpureonotata Pic, 1927 – Southwestern China (Yunnan)
- Trichochrysea quadrifasciata (Jacoby, 1889)
  - Trichochrysea quadrifasciata igneicollis Medvedev & Eroshkina, 1999 – Thailand
  - Trichochrysea quadrifasciata quadrifasciata (Jacoby, 1889) – Myanmar
- Trichochrysea robusta Pic, 1926 – Vietnam, Laos
- Trichochrysea rufofemoralis Jacoby, 1908 – Myanmar
- Trichochrysea sakishimana Komiya, 1985 – Ryukyu Islands
- Trichochrysea sericea Pic, 1926 – Southwestern China (Yunnan)
- Trichochrysea similis Chen, 1935 – Southwestern China (Guangxi), Vietnam
- Trichochrysea sinensis Chen, 1940 – Northern China
- Trichochrysea singaporensis Medvedev, 2009 – Singapore
- Trichochrysea speciosa (Jacoby, 1896) – Sumatra
- Trichochrysea tarsata Achard, 1921 – Southwestern China (Guizhou), Vietnam, Laos
- Trichochrysea transversicollis Medvedev & Eroshkina, 1999 – Thailand
- Trichochrysea trapezicollis Medvedev & Eroshkina, 1999 – Thailand
- Trichochrysea truncata Medvedev & Sprecher-Uebersax, 1999 – Nepal
- Trichochrysea undulata Pic, 1926 – Western China (Xizang)
- Trichochrysea variegata (Jacoby, 1889) – Myanmar
- Trichochrysea vestita Baly, 1861 – Nepal, Northern and Northeastern India, Myanmar
- Trichochrysea viridilabris Heller, 1923 – Southwestern China (Sichuan)
- Trichochrysea vitalisi (Berlioz, 1917) – Thailand, Laos

Central Asian species:

- Trichochrysea amygdali (Ogloblin in Semenov & Ogloblin, 1941)
  - Trichochrysea amygdali amygdali (Ogloblin in Semenov & Ogloblin, 1941) – Tajikistan
  - Trichochrysea amygdali nuratavica Lopatin, 1976 – Uzbekistan
- Trichochrysea arnoldii (Medvedev, 1957) – Kazakhstan, Kyrgyzstan
- Trichochrysea occidentalis (Weise, 1887) – Kazakhstan, Uzbekistan

Synonyms:

- Trichochrysea bhamoensis Jacoby, 1908 (not T. bhamoensis (Jacoby, 1892)): renamed to Trichochrysea jacobyi Medvedev, 2000
- Trichochrysea celebensis (Jacoby, 1895): synonym of Trichochrysea hirta (Fabricius, 1801)
- Trichochrysea humeralis Pic, 1928: synonym of Trichochrysea cephalotes (Lefèvre, 1893)
- Trichochrysea gloriosa (Lefèvre, 1893): synonym of Trichochrysea aeneipennis (Lefèvre, 1890)
- Trichochrysea griseonotata Pic, 1936: possible synonym of Trichochrysea fasciata Chen, 1940
- Trichochrysea laosensis Pic, 1928: synonym of Trichochrysea hebe (Baly, 1864)
- Trichochrysea nitida (Jacoby, 1892): synonym of Trichochrysea clypeata (Jacoby, 1889)
- Trichochrysea severini Jacoby, 1900: synonym of Trichochrysea vestita Baly, 1861
- Trichochrysea splendida Achard, 1921: synonym of Trichochrysea hebe (Baly, 1864)
- Trichochrysea superba Pic, 1934: synonym of Trichochrysea mouhoti Baly, 1861
- Trichochrysea viridipes Pic, 1936: synonym of Trichochrysea cephalotes (Lefèvre, 1893)
