= Antoine Reille =

- Born: 2 December 1942
- Occupation: Ornithologist

Antoine François Marie Reille, born on December 2, 1942, in Touraine, is a French ornithologist and huntsman.

== Biography ==
Antoine Reille is the honorary president of the Ligue pour la protection des oiseaux (The League for the Protection of Birds) and founder of France Nature Environnement. An active defender of natural heritage, he was also vice-president of the Permanent Committee of the National Council for Nature Protection and administrator of WWF France.

Antoine Reille, the youngest of six children of Baron Karl Reille (1886–1975) and Baroness Odette Goury du Roslan, is a former student of the École normale supérieure in the scientific stream for the "Ulm" competition of 1961. He obtained his aggregation in physics in July 1965.

In 1964, he joined the office of the Ligue pour la protection des oiseaux (LPO) as general secretary under the presidency of Jean Delacour. He then collaborated on the television show Les Animaux du Monde, produced and directed by François de La Grange.

At the LPO, Antoine Reille became general secretary from 1965 to 1976, vice-president from 1976 to 1978, and president from 1978 to 1986.

From 1969, Antoine Reille, an assistant professor at the Faculté des sciences in Paris, was part of the team of animal specialists called upon by François de La Grange for his television show Les Animaux du Monde. After the death of François de La Grange in 1976, he became the producer of the wildlife show alongside Marlyse de La Grange.

With François de La Grange, he is one of the founders in 1969 of the association des Journalistes-écrivains pour la nature et l'écologie (JNE).

Sometimes in collaboration with François de La Grange, he has written numerous books about animals, humans, and nature, including a children's book.

He published his father's works: memoirs and watercolors on the themes of hunting, the famous Baudry rally founded in Cerelles by his grandfather Baron Victor Reille and taken over by his father, as well as the castles and manors of Indre-et-Loire.

In March 2008, he was elected mayor of Nouzilly for a six-year term.

He is president of the private foresters' union in Touraine, and despite his commitment to the LPO, he considers that "hunting is an essential activity for the balance of the wooded environments and the preservation of landscapes" and is a defender of hunting with hounds, which he still practises.

== Publications ==
- François de La Grange and Antoine Reille, Les Oiseaux du Monde, pub. Fernand Nathan, Paris, 1970.
- François de La Grange and Antoine Reille, Animaux et Réserves de France, pub. Fernand Nathan, Paris, 1972.
- François de La Grange and Antoine Reille, L'Homme et la Nature, pub. Fernand Nathan, Paris, 1974.
- François de La Grange and Antoine Reille, Les Oiseaux et leurs secrets, pub. Fernand Nathan, Paris, 1975.
- Antoine Reille & Marlyse de La Grange, La vie dans la savane, pub. Fernand Nathan, Paris, 1978.
- Marlyse de La Grange et Antoine Reille, Les Animaux du Monde en Poésie, coll. L'Enfant, la poésie (6-12 ans), pub. Saint-Germain-des-Prés, Paris, 1982. ISBN 2-243-02003-3
- Antoine Reille, Protégeons la nature, coll. L'encyclopédie buissonnière, Nathan, Paris, 1992. ISBN 2-09-222316-X
- Chantal Cans & Antoine Reille, Guide Delachaux et Niestlé des 134 réserves naturelles de France, collection "Les Guides pratiques du naturaliste", Delachaux et Niestlé, Lausanne, 1997. ISBN 2-603-01025-5
- Antoine Reille, Guide des parcs naturels régionaux : Le patrimoine naturel, la vie traditionnelle, collection "La bibliothèque du naturaliste", Delachaux et Niestlé, Lausanne, 2000. ISBN 2-603-01151-0
- Nicolas Gendre, Antoine Reille et Francis Meunier, Oiseaux des réserves naturelles de France, Delachaux et Niestlé, Paris, 2007. ISBN 978-2-603-01437-0
- François-Nicolas Martinet (illustrations), Antoine Reille (text), Histoire des oiseaux, Bibliothèque des Introuvables, 2008.
- Jean-Paul Grossin, Antoine Reille, Pierre Moinot, Anthologie du cerf, Hatier

- Prix Jacques-Lacroix 1993 de l'Académie Française

== See also ==
=== Related articles ===
- Honoré Charles Reille
- René Reille
