= Lucignolo (disambiguation) =

Lucignolo is a 1999 Italian film.

Lucignolo may also refer to:

- Candlewick (character), a character from the book The Adventures of Pinocchio.
- Lucignolo (beetle), a genus of leaf beetles named after the above character.
