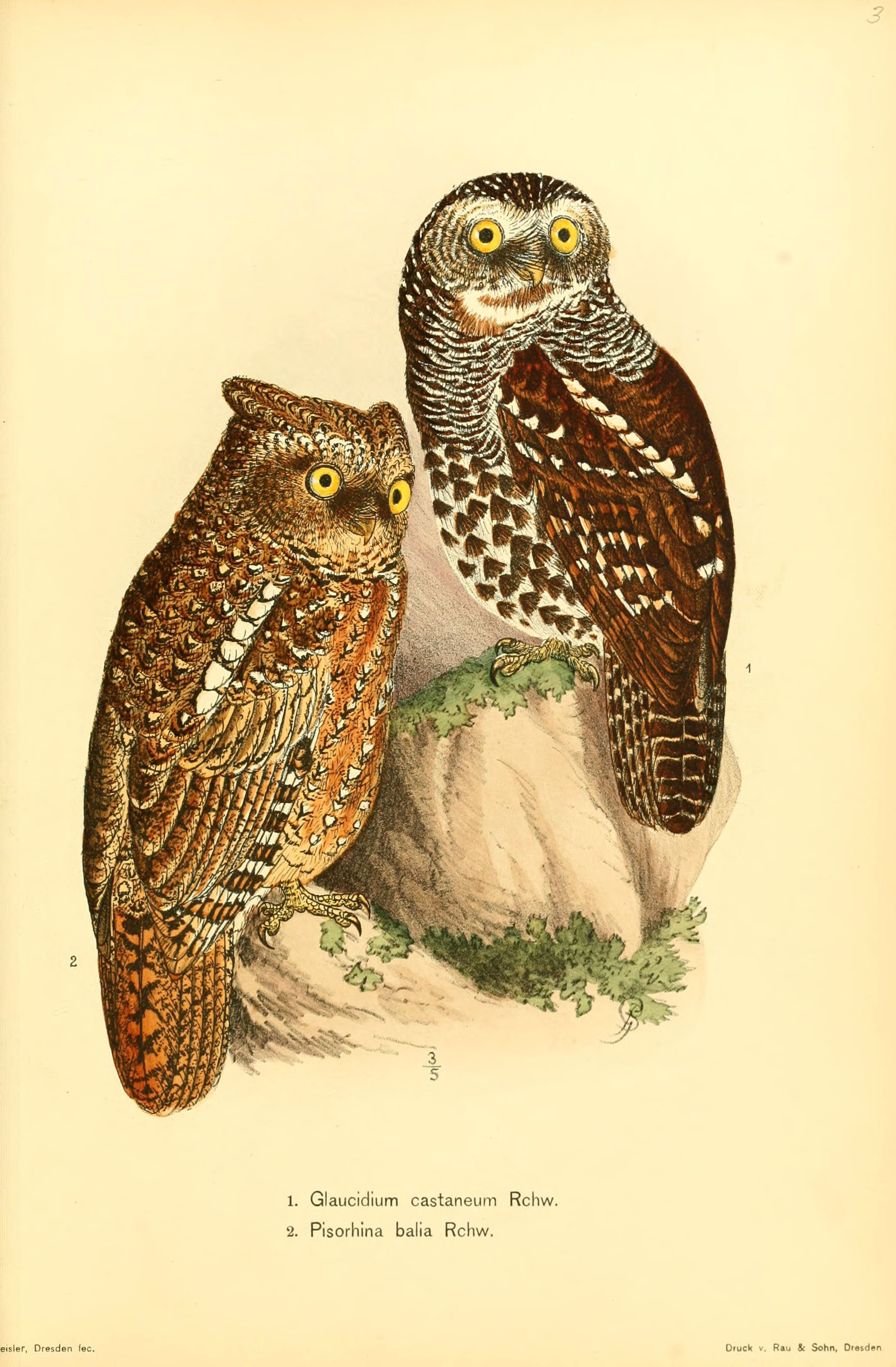

Conservation status
- Least Concern (IUCN 3.1)

Scientific classification
- Kingdom: Animalia
- Phylum: Chordata
- Class: Aves
- Order: Strigiformes
- Family: Strigidae
- Genus: Glaucidium
- Species: G. capense
- Subspecies: G. c. castaneum

Trinomial name
- Glaucidium capense castaneum Neumann, 1893

= Chestnut owlet =

Species of bird

The chestnut owlet (Glaucidium capense castaneum) is a subspecies of owl to the African barred owlet in the family Strigidae. It is found in the Albertine Rift montane forests.

== Description ==
The chestnut owlet is a small owlet which is rather similar to the African barred owlet, which is larger. The adult chestnut owlet has a brown facial disk which is marked with dark bars and flecks and whitish eyebrows. The upperparts are chestnut with a white spotted crown and a white shoulder line formed by the outer wens of the scapulars. The paler underparts are marked with dense barring on the breast, with spots on the rest of the underparts. The eyes are yellow, the cere and bill are greenish yellow, the legs are feathered and the toes are dirty yellow but rather bristly. They are 20–21.5 cm (7.9–8.5 in) in length.

== Distribution and subspecies ==
This bird is closely related to the African barred owlet and is considered a subspecies.

== Habits and habitat ==
The chestnut owlet occurs in humid lowland rainforest and montane forest, at 1,000–1,700 m (3,300–5,600 ft) in altitude.

The biology of the chestnut owlet is little known but like the related African barred owlet it is partly diurnal. Like other owls it will be mobbed by small passerines if discovered at its roost. Its prey is small vertebrates and arthropods, which are either caught from a perch or gleaned from the foliage.
