= Trichostola =

Scientific classification
- Kingdom: Animalia
- Phylum: Arthropoda
- Clade: Pancrustacea
- Class: Insecta
- Order: Coleoptera
- Suborder: Polyphaga
- Infraorder: Cucujiformia
- Family: Chrysomelidae
- Subfamily: Eumolpinae
- Tribe: Euryopini
- Genus: Trichostola; Chapuis, 1874

Type species
- Trichostola vestita (= Trichostola chapuisi Jacoby, 1898) Chapuis, 1874

Synonyms
- Trichostola Chevrolat in Dejean, 1836 (nomen nudum)

Genus of leaf beetles

Trichostola is a genus of leaf beetles in the subfamily Eumolpinae. It is distributed on the Mascarene Islands. Some species placed in the genus have also been described from mainland Africa and Madagascar, but according to Jan Bechyné (1957) these actually belong to other genera. Additionally, some species described from Australia were placed in the genus by Julius Weise in 1923, but these are also considered to be misplaced.

== Species ==
Species described from Réunion and Mauritius:

- Trichostola alluaudi Jacoby, 1898 – Mauritius
- Trichostola aurata Jacoby, 1898 – Mauritius
- Trichostola berliozi Bechyné, 1957
  - Trichostola berliozi antennalis Bechyné, 1957 – Réunion
  - Trichostola berliozi berliozi Bechyné, 1957 – Mauritius
- Trichostola callitrichia Bechyné, 1957 – Mauritius
- Trichostola cariei Berlioz, 1915 – Mauritius
- Trichostola chapuisi Jacoby, 1898 – Réunion
- Trichostola chrysoptera Bechyné, 1957 – Mauritius
- Trichostola collaris Berlioz, 1915
  - Trichostola collaris collaris Berlioz, 1915 – Mauritius
  - Trichostola collaris reunionis Bechyné, 1957 – Réunion
- Trichostola cribricollis Berlioz, 1915 – Mauritius
- Trichostola emmerezi Berlioz, 1915 – Mauritius
- Trichostola evops Berlioz, 1915
  - Trichostola evops evops Berlioz, 1915 – Mauritius
  - Trichostola evops vicaria Bechyné, 1957 – Réunion
- Trichostola fasciatipennis Jacoby, 1902 – Mauritius
- Trichostola femoralis Jacoby, 1902 – Mauritius
- Trichostola intermedia Berlioz, 1915 – Mauritius
- Trichostola mameti Bechyné, 1957 – Mauritius
- Trichostola ornata Berlioz, 1915 – Mauritius, Réunion
- Trichostola perilampina Bechyné, 1957 – Mauritius
- Trichostola pilula Berlioz, 1915 – Mauritius
- Trichostola striatipennis Jacoby, 1898 – Mauritius
- Trichostola tenuepunctata Berlioz, 1915 – Mauritius
- Trichostola thoracica Jacoby, 1902 – Mauritius
- Trichostola umbilicata Bechyné, 1957 – Mauritius
- Trichostola variegata Jacoby, 1898 – Mauritius
- Trichostola vestita (Boheman, 1858)
  - Trichostola vestita vestita (Boheman, 1858) – Mauritius
  - Trichostola vestita viridicata Bechyné, 1957 – Réunion
- Trichostola vinsoni Bechyné, 1957 – Mauritius

Species described from Rodrigues Island:

- Trichostola pauliani Vinson, 1961 (nomen nudum)

Species described from mainland Africa and Madagascar (to be placed in other genera):

- Trichostola capensis Lefèvre, 1890 – South Africa, now placed in Lucignolo
- Trichostola fuscitarsis Chapuis, 1879 – Ethiopia, Somalia
- Trichostola grandis Fairmaire, 1901 – Madagascar, now placed in Pseudostola
- Trichostola grossa Harold, 1878 – Tanzania
- Trichostola lefevrei Jacoby, 1898 – South Africa
- Trichostola magnicollis Fairmaire, 1886 – Djibouti

Species described from Australia (or Trichostola Weise, 1923)

- Trichostola amoena Weise, 1923
- Trichostola macilenta Weise, 1923
- Trichostola multiseriata Weise, 1923
- Trichostola nubila Weise, 1923
- Trichostola peregrina Weise, 1923
- Trichostola similis Weise, 1923
