= Robert-Daniel Etchécopar =

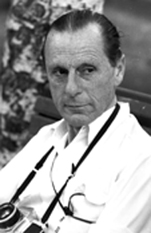

Robert-Daniel Etchécopar (4 September 1905 – 14 January 1990) was a French ornithologist, conservationist and traveller. He joined several expeditions to study birds and authored books on the birds of north Africa, as well as of the China, Mongolia and the Korean region.

Etchécopar was born in Quimperlé in a family of notaries and was expected to follow the family tradition in law. He received a doctorate in law from Paris in 1933 and worked for a few years as a business lawyer. He then gave it up to write and promote bird conservation. In 1939 he worked as a liaison officer for the staff of the 12th British Division and after World War II, he joined the Natural History Museum in Paris in the zoology department under Jacques Berlioz. He also became secretary general for the French Ornithological Society in 1944, which he had joined in 1935. In 1954 he directed the French ringing effort as director of the research centre on the migration of mammals and birds and in 1963 he headed the EURING project to coordinate ringing across Europe.
