= Louis Magaud d'Aubusson =

French ornithologist

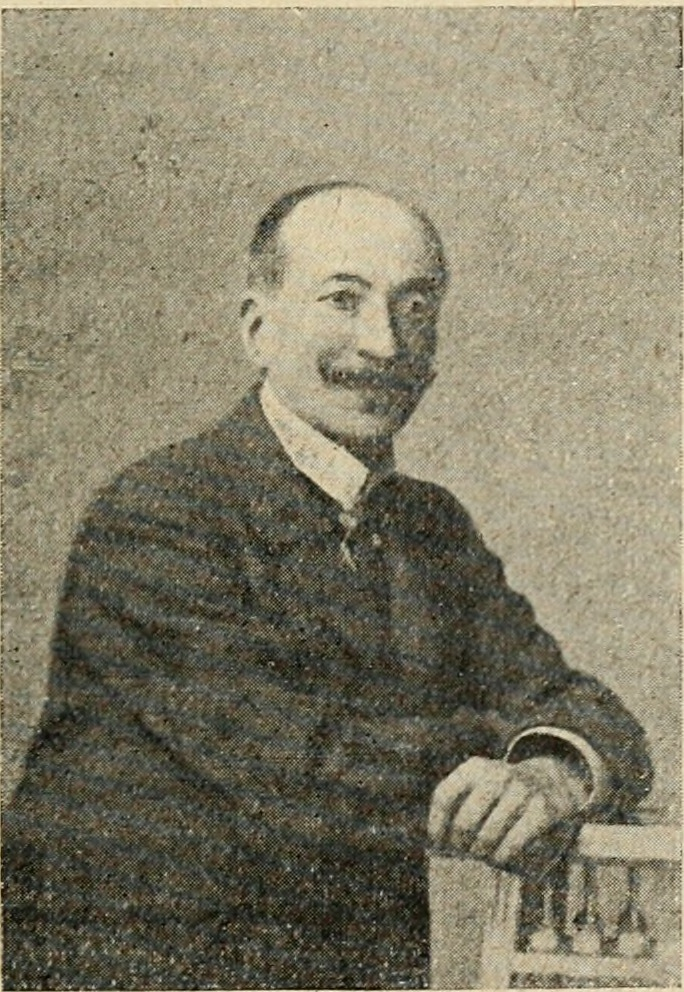
- Born: May 11, 1847
- Died: November 18, 1917 (aged 70)
- Occupation: Ornithology

Louis Magaud d'Aubusson was a French ornithologist, born on May 11, 1847 in Clermont-Ferrand (Puy-de-Dôme) and died in the 16th arrondissement of Paris, on November 18, 1917.

== Biography ==
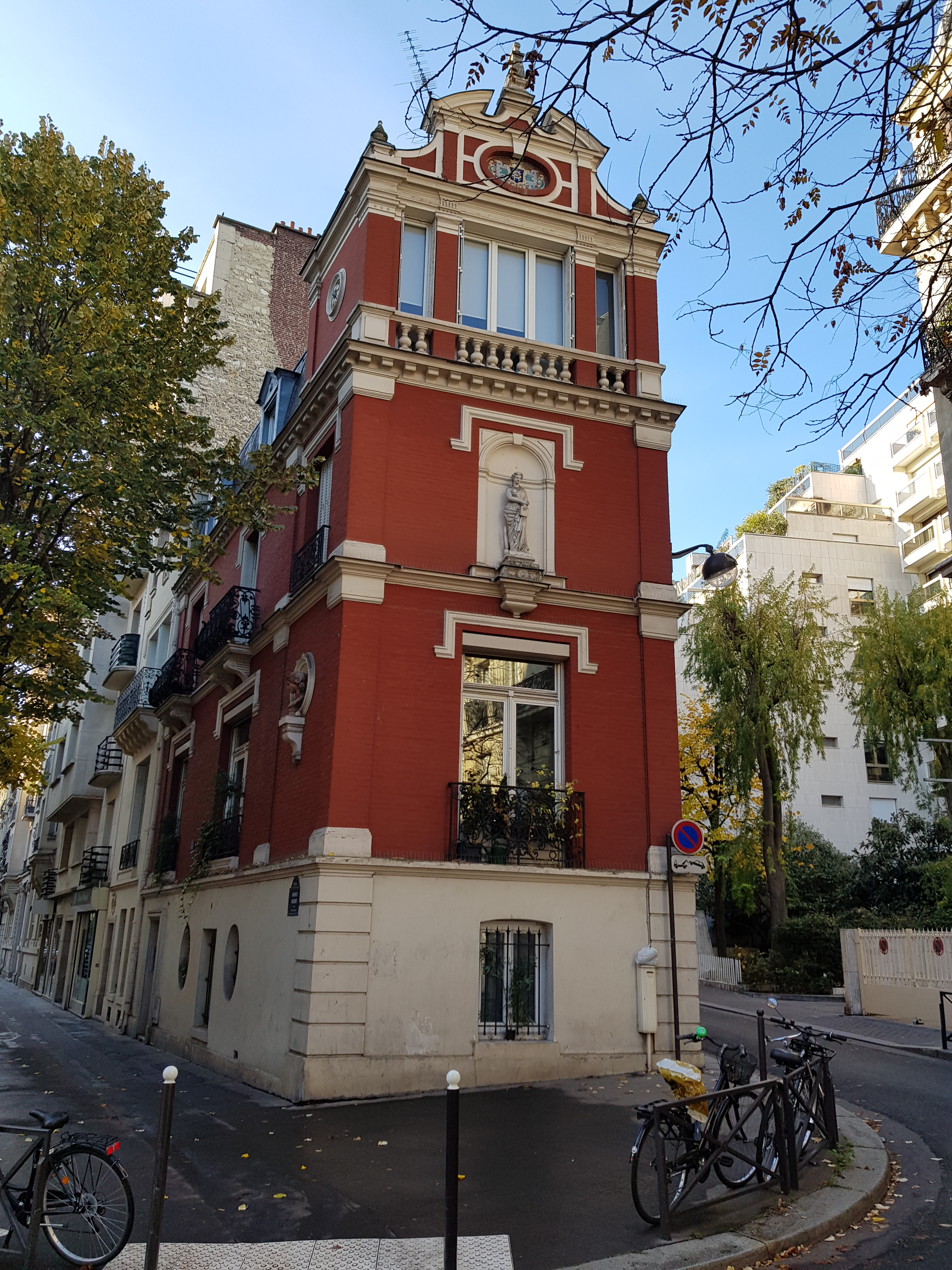
66, Avenue Mozart: Louis Magaud d'Aubusson's Paris home

Louis Magaud d'Aubusson, a doctor of law, joined the Société nationale d'acclimatation de France in 1880. He served as its archivist from 1887 to 1892, then became an administrator and president of the ornithology section in 1907. A passionate hunter of waterfowl and falconer, he first became known for a work dedicated to falconry and the biology of birds of prey. He was also an honorary member of the Institut d'Égypte of Cairo and was the author of a renowned work on quail hunting in Egypt. On January 26, 1912, he became the first president of the Ligue pour la protection des oiseaux and remained in that position until his death. He intervened to stop the slaughter of puffins on the Sept-Îles archipelago off Perros-Guirec.

He authored numerous ornithological monographs, including Les corvidés (1883) and Les gallinacés d'Asie (Paris, 1888), in addition to his important work on the history of falconry.

He published several articles in Revue française d’ornithologie, Revue des sciences naturelles appliquées, and Bulletin de la Société nationale d'acclimatation.

He was the owner of the château de Polagnat, he served as mayor of Saint-Bonnet-près-Orcival (Puy-de-Dôme) from 1872 to 1876 and from 1884 to 1888.

== Publications ==
- 1883: Oiseaux de la France. Première monographie. Corvidés. Histoire naturelle générale et particulière des passereaux déodactyles cultrirostres observés en France. Paris, A. Quantin, 107 p.
- 1885: Catalogue raisonné par région, des espèces d'oiseaux qu'il y aurait lieu d'acclimater et domestiquer en France. Bull. Soc. Accl, 2 : 471–499.
- 1886: Bull. Soc. Accl, 3 : 1–29, 244–261, 417–429, 573–580.
- 1887: Bull. Soc. Accl, 4 : 147–161, 337–348, 424–439, 599–635, 721–740.
- 1887: Sur la conformation des serres de quelques rapaces diurnes et la manière dont ils en usent pour offenser leur proie. Le Naturaliste, 9 : 119–122.
- 1887: Document inédit pour servir à l'histoire du rheinharte ocellé. Bull. Soc. Accl, 4 : 337–348.
- 1894: Esquisse de la faune égyptienne. Première partie. Oiseaux et reptiles. Le Caire, Imprimerie nationale, 24 pages.
- 1915: La protection des oiseaux, guide pratique

== Bibliography ==
- René Ronsil (1948). Bibliographie ornithologique française. Paris, Lechevalier, 1948. Tome 1, n° 1857.
