= François-Nicolas Martinet =

French engineer, engraver and naturalist

François-Nicolas Martinet (French pronunciation: [fʁɑ̃swa nikɔla maʁtinɛ]; 1731 - c. 1800) was a French engineer, engraver and naturalist. Although trained as an engineer and an architectural drafter, he began to produce engravings for books and it later became his primary profession.

Martinet's year of birth is known but sources are divided on the year of his death. Little is known of his life, a son, Aaron Martinet, became a print dealer in Paris. By 1756 he became engraver for the King's cabinet, reporting to the Maison du Roi. Martinet engraved the plates for numerous works on natural history, especially ornithology. Notable in particular are those for Buffon's natural history where he made 1008 engravings. He also contributed 21 ornithological illustrations to Diderot and d'Alembert's Encyclopédie.

His major work was for l'Ornithologia, sive Synopsis methodica of Mathurin Jacques Brisson (1760–63) to which he contributed extensively.

Some of his plates have been of importance in the taxonomy and identification of now extinct species. Some of his engravings were later hand coloured and these are not uniform or consistent across copies. He also produced illustrations of architecture, landscape, and theatre.

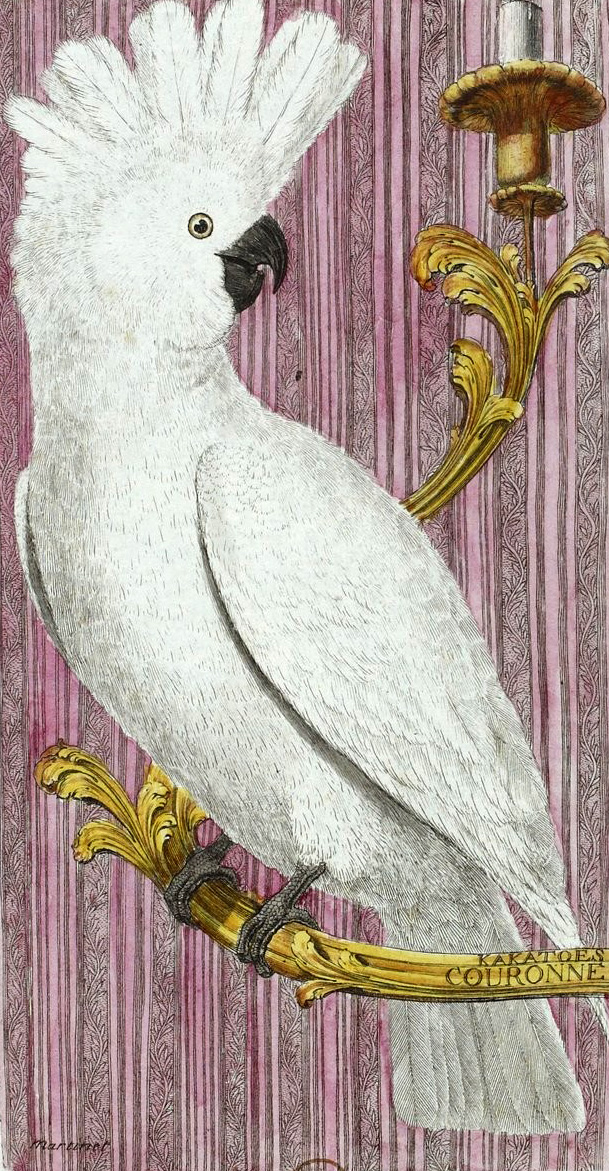
Cockatoo, 1790

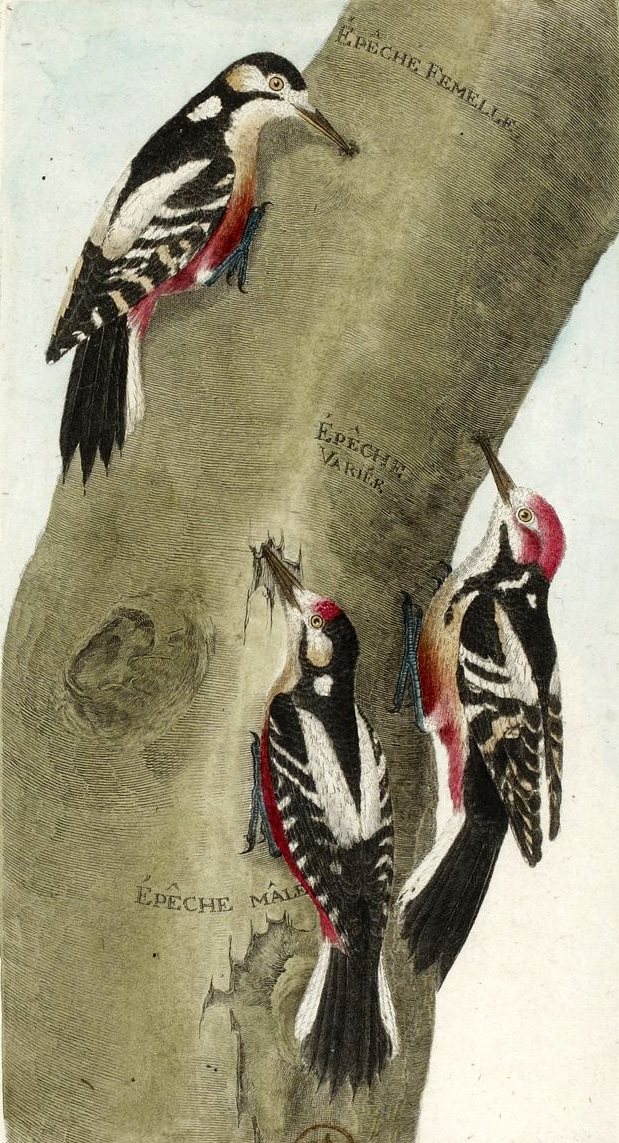
A Great spotted woodpecker on the left with a Middle spotted woodpecker (right) and a Lesser spotted woodpecker

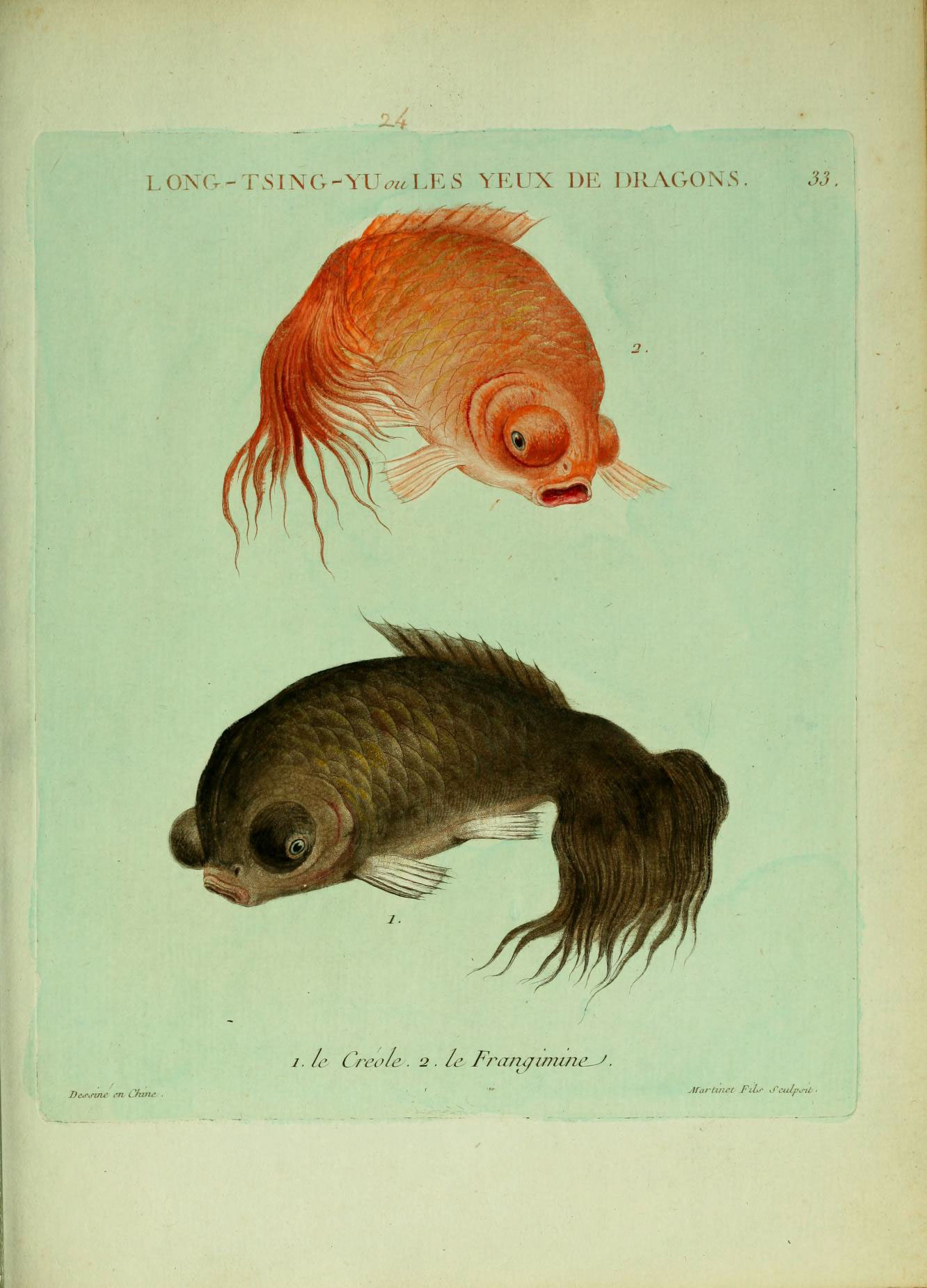
Goldfish from the ″Histoire naturelle des dorades de la Chine″ (1780)

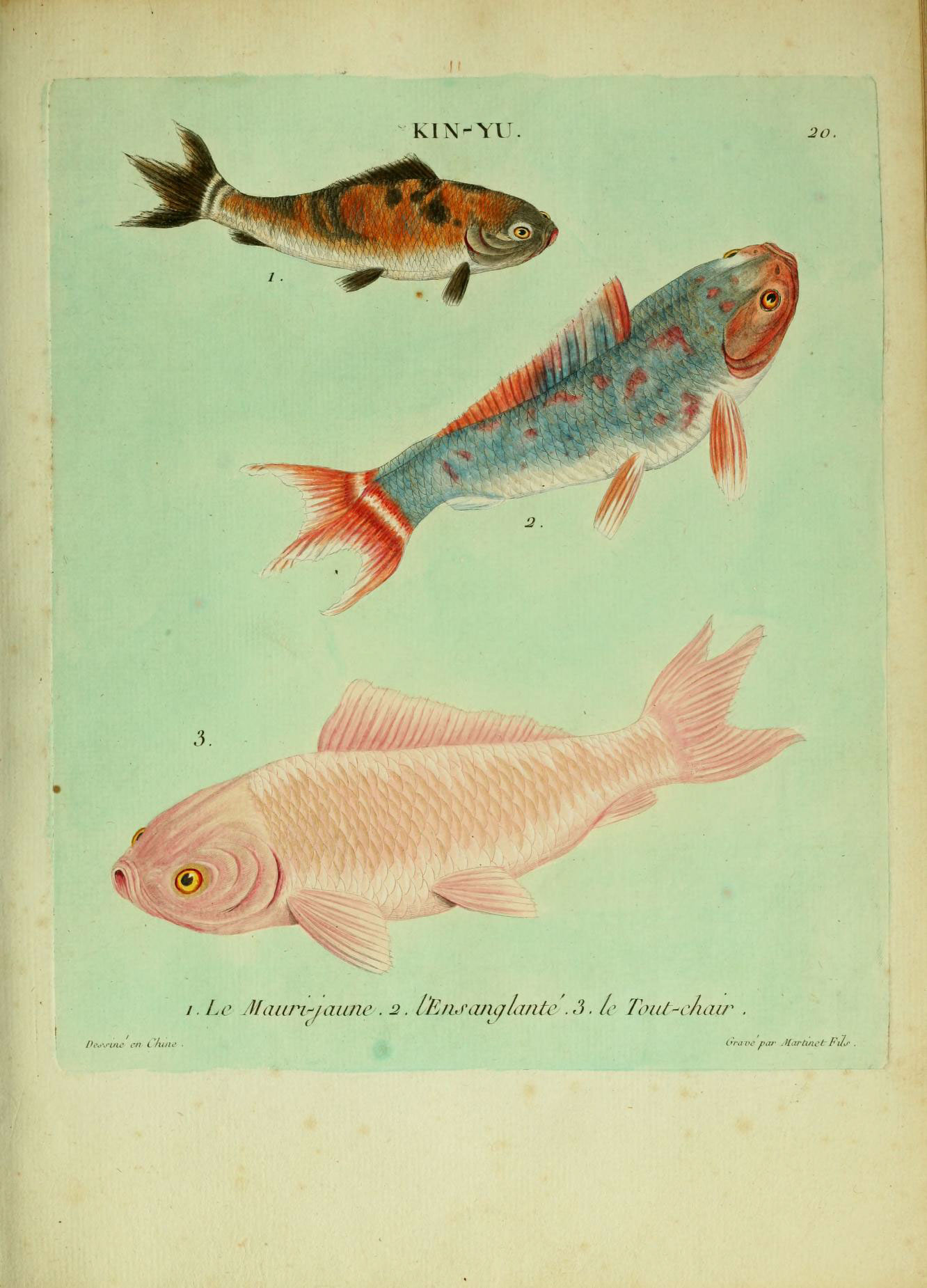
Varieties of goldfish from the ″Histoire naturelle des dorades de la Chine″ (1780)

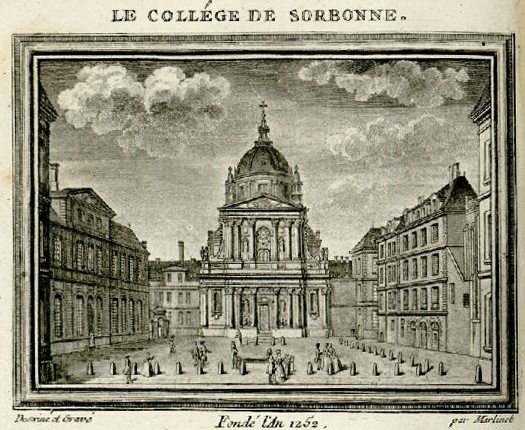
Collège de Sorbonne (1781)

== Other sources ==
- L'Histoire des oiseaux, peints dans leurs aspects apparents et sensibles, éd. originale conservée en un unique exemplaire au Trinity College d'Hartford. Nouvelle édition par le Bibliothèque des introuvables, avec les 208 gravures, 450 pages avec le texte originale et des commentaires d'Antoine Reille, ancien producteur de l'émission Les Animaux du monde.
