= Le Courrier de la Nature =

French nature magazine

- Type: Quarterly magazine
- Publisher: Société nationale de protection de la nature
- Editor-in-chief: Rémi Luglia
- Founded: 1961
- Language: French language
- City: Paris
- Country: France
- ISSN: 0011-0477
- Website: www.snpn.com

Le Courrier de la Nature is a French quarterly magazine dedicated to nature and its protection. It is published by the Société nationale de protection de la nature et d'acclimatation de France (SNPN), a voluntary organization recognized as being in the public interest in France.

It is a scientific journal aimed at a wide audience. It now has 68 pages. It is distributed by issue or as part of paid subscriptions that include four issues per year and are subscribed to via SNPN.

== History ==
Le Courrier de la Nature' was created in 1961 by the Comité d'information-diffusion of the SNPN, led by Jean-Baptiste de Vilmorin, the son of the association's president at that time, Roger de Vilmorin. The official launch of the magazine took place at the Foire de Paris (18-29 May 1961) within the Salon international de la Nature, where the SNPN presented the exhibition "Protection de la nature." The first series of Le Courrier de la Nature consisted of twenty issues. In 1967, the magazine adopted a new format and launched its new series (from issue no. 1 to present).

From 1968 to 1977, Le Courrier de la Nature collaborated with the Ligue pour la protection des oiseaux to create a joint publication titled Le Courrier de la Nature. L'Homme et l'Oiseau.

=== Publication history ===
- Summer 1961 - March 1966: Le Courrier de la Nature. First series published under the code (ISSN 0373-9880) and numbered from 1 to 20, with several double issues (no. 4-5, 10-11, 13-14, 16-17, 19-20). The publication is quarterly, or semi-annually for the double issues. The format is 16 × 24 cm.
- 1967-1977: Second series, which associates Le Courrier de la Nature with the magazine published by LPO L'Homme et l'Oiseau (ISSN 0374-809X) following the editorial reflections of the first issue on the various efforts by nature protectors. This joint magazine is titled Le Courrier de la Nature, l'Homme et l'Oiseau and has the code (ISSN 1162-4671). The format is 21 × 27 cm. The publication is quarterly. The numbering starts again at 1 with the double issue 1-2 of January 1967.
- In 1973 (no. 27), the cover is printed in colour for the first time.
- 1977 to present: The title reverts back to Le Courrier de la Nature, the code changes to (ISSN 0011-0477), but the numbering continues with issue no. 50 of July–August 1977. The publication becomes bi-monthly.
- In 1978 (no. 53), the internal pages include color photographs.
- In 1987, on the magazine's 20th anniversary (no. 107), the format changes to 21 × 29.7 cm.
- Until November 2022 (no. 335), the publication is bi-monthly with six issues of 52 pages and one special issue per year.
- In 2023 (no. 336), the magazine changes its format by combining a regular issue and a special report in each issue. The periodicity returns to quarterly with four issues of 68 pages per year. The price of each issue also increases from €8 to €14.

== Editorial policy ==
Le Courrier de la Nature' offers, through in-depth articles, a broad range of topics aimed at informing and raising awareness among the general public about issues related to the protection of wildlife and wild flora, natural habitats, and biodiversity conservation. The magazine also includes various sections covering current events, bibliographical analysis, the life of the association and its reserves (such as the National Nature Reserve of Lac de Grand-Lieu and the National Nature Reserve of Camargue, which it manages), as well as a calendar of various nature-related events.

Unfunded by government subsidies, Le Courrier de la Nature is supported through subscriptions, donations, and bequests from its members and supporters. Given the tax-exempt status of SNPN, Le Courrier de la Nature does not contain any advertisements.

== Bibliography ==
- Le Courrier de la Nature, Paris, SNPN, no. 1, 1961.
- Le Courrier de la Nature, Paris, SNPN, no. 213, June 2004 ISSN 0011-0477, Spécial SNPN 150th anniversary, p. 64-65.
