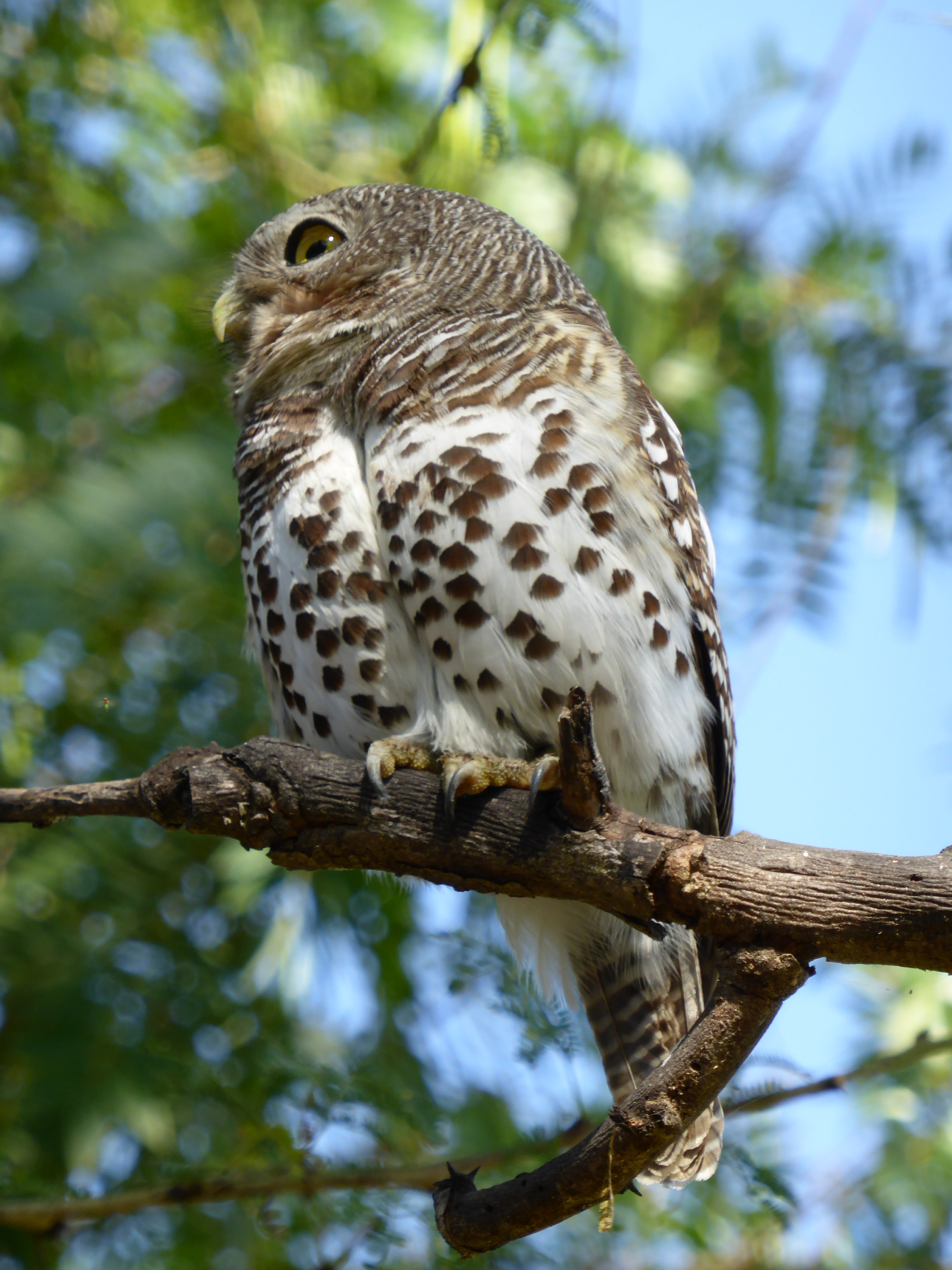
- In Kruger National Park, South Africa

Conservation status
- Least Concern (IUCN 3.1)
- CITES Appendix II

Scientific classification
- Kingdom: Animalia
- Phylum: Chordata
- Class: Aves
- Order: Strigiformes
- Family: Strigidae
- Genus: Glaucidium
- Species: G. capense

Binomial name
- Glaucidium capense (Smith, 1834)

= African barred owlet =

Species of owl

The African barred owlet (Glaucidium capense) is a species of small owl in the family Strigidae found in much of southern, central and eastern Africa. The taxon may be four species rather than a single species.

== Description ==
The African barred owlet is a small owlet that shows some geographic variation (see Taxonomy). The nominate subspecies is greyish brown above with fine buff bars and a narrow white eyebrow. The scapulars and greater wing coverts have white outer webs with dark brown tips and form a white stripe across the shoulder and the folded wing. The brown chest is finely barred with buff and the breast and flanks are white with brown spots. The underwing coverts, legs and vent are white, while the flight feathers and tail are brown barred with rufous. The bill and cere are dull greenish yellow and the eyes, legs and feet are yellow. Length is about 17 cm (6.7 in) and wingspan is about 40 cm (16 in).

=== Call ===
The call of the African barred owlet is a series of single pitched purring notes.

== Distribution and habitat ==
G. capense is endemic to Southern and Eastern Africa from Kenya and the Eastern Cape to Western Angola.

The African barred owlet occurs in open habitats with trees such as gallery forest, woodland, forest edge and secondary growth.

== Behaviour ==
The African barred owlet is partly diurnal. Calling occurs mainly at dusk and dawn but also through the night on calm and clear nights. It is frequently observed on open perches scanning for prey, even during the day. It roosts within cover, often in a natural cavity in a tree. If they are detected by other birds during the day they will often be subjected to mobbing. The African barred owlet feeds on small mammals, birds, reptiles, frogs, insects, scorpions and caterpillars which are normally caught following a short flight from a perch.

Both sexes call to proclaim their territory, most frequently before breeding. The nest site is usually a tree cavity 3–6 m (9.8–19.7 ft) from the ground. Two or three eggs are laid from September to November. The young are fed by both parents but only in the dark, fledging after 30–33 days and becoming independent after 7–12 months.

== Taxonomy ==
There are currently three subspecies recognised but many authorities recognise each of these as a separate species. Others in the complex like G. capense etchecopari (or Etchecopar's barred owl) are of uncertain status. The subspecies are:

- Glaucidium capense capense: southern Mozambique to Kwazulu-Natal and the Eastern Cape.
- Glaucidium capense ngamiense: eastern Democratic Republic of the Congo to central Tanzania (including Mafia Island), south to Angola, northern Namibia, northern Botswana, Zimbabwe, and Mozambique.
- Glaucidium capense scheffleri: extreme southern coastal Somalia, eastern Kenya and north-eastern Tanzania.
