= Visionature =

Visionature is a citizen science program initiated by the Ligue pour la protection des oiseaux (LPO) in 2007. It is now managed by around fifty French associations under the Faune-France umbrella and coordinated by the Ligue pour la protection des oiseaux. Its goal is to qualitatively and quantitatively expand knowledge about numerous species found in metropolitan France, track their evolution, and support conservation efforts.

The program allows participating amateur naturalists to record observations of various taxa through the Faune-France web portal. This nature platform contains over fifty million data points, with birds making up the majority.

Used in about a dozen European countries, the Visionature system centralizes nearly 300 million data points collected through various means including the mobile app NaturaList.
