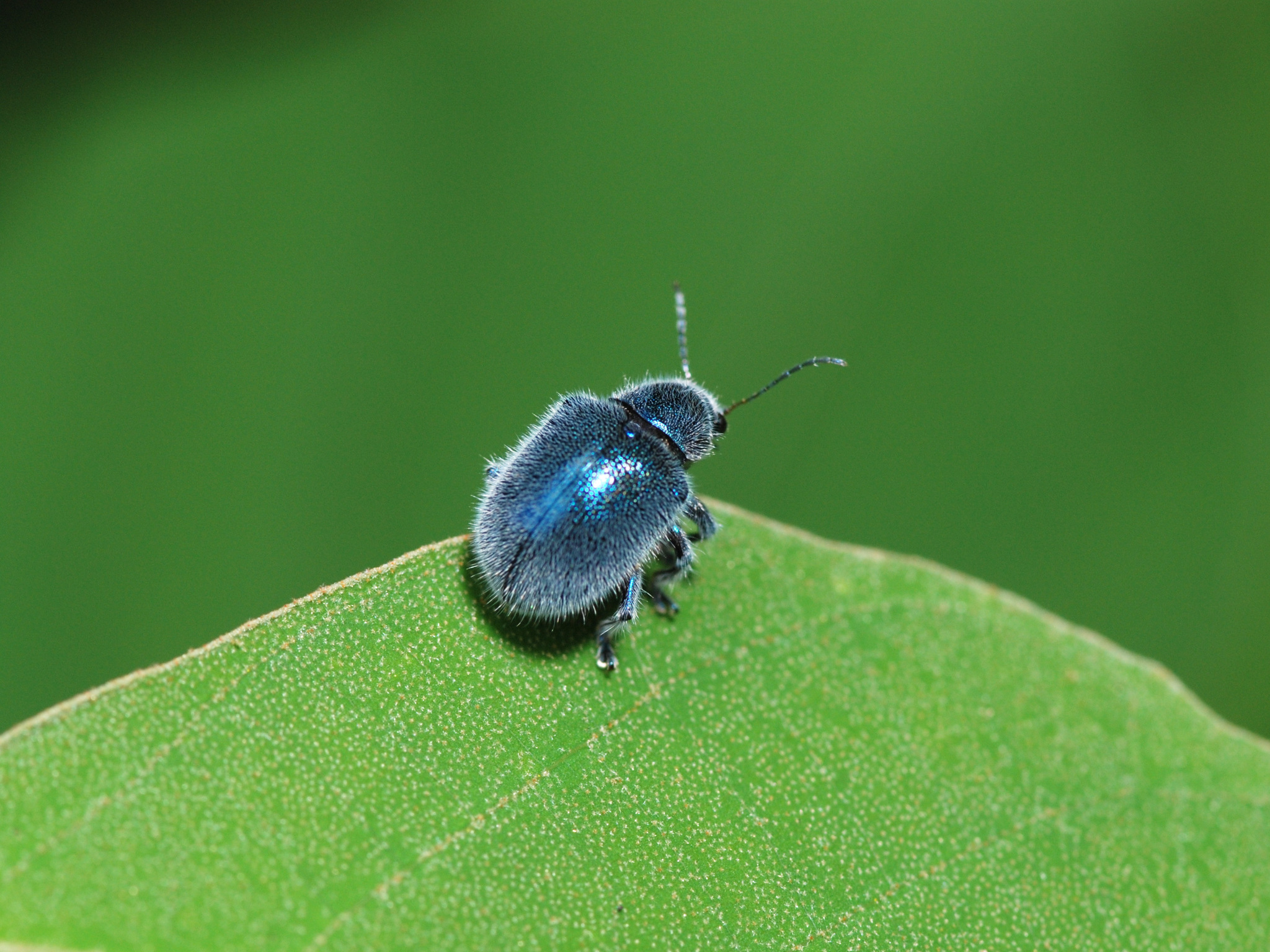
- Trichochrysea hirta, Singapore

Scientific classification
- Kingdom: Animalia
- Phylum: Arthropoda
- Clade: Pancrustacea
- Class: Insecta
- Order: Coleoptera
- Suborder: Polyphaga
- Infraorder: Cucujiformia
- Family: Chrysomelidae
- Subfamily: Eumolpinae
- Tribe: Bromiini
- Genus: Trichochrysea
- Species: T. hirta

Binomial name
- Trichochrysea hirta (Fabricius, 1801)

Synonyms
- sensu stricto: Eumolpus hirtus Fabricius, 1801; Heteraspis celebensis Jacoby, 1895; viridis: Heteraspis viridis Jacoby, 1892

= Trichochrysea hirta =

Species of leaf beetle

Trichochrysea hirta is a species of leaf beetle found in Indonesia and Peninsular Malaysia in Southeast Asia. It has a metallic blue or green body covered with white hair, after which the species gets its scientific name: the species epithet, hirta, is derived from the Latin hirtus, meaning "hairy".

== Description ==
The adult of Trichochrysea hirta has a metallic blue or green body, with dense white pubescence. Its head is coarsely punctured. The basal four or five segments of the antennae are rufo-piceous beneath, the second and third sometimes entirely so, the basal segment cupreo-aureus. It measures 5.8–10.0 mm in length.

== Taxonomy ==
The species was first described from Sumatra as Eumolpus hirtus by Johan Christian Fabricius in his 1801 Systema eleutheratorum. The species is currently a member of the genus Trichochrysea in the subfamily Eumolpinae.

Two subspecies of Trichochrysea hirta are recognised in Volume 6 of the Catalogue of Palaearctic Coleoptera:

- Trichochrysea hirta hirta (Fabricius, 1801)
- Trichochrysea hirta viridis (Jacoby, 1892)

In 1987, two different subspecies of Trichochrysea hirta were recognised: T. h. hirta and T. h. nitidissima, with T. h. viridis as a synonym of the former. These differed mainly in the colour of the upper side. In 2007, T. hirta was instead divided into two species, based on differences in the shape of the aedeagus: specimens from Indonesia and Peninsular Malaysia (which have an aedeagus with an acute triangular apex) were considered true T. hirta, while those from mainland Asia (which have a broad aedeagus with truncated apex, with a small central tip) were now considered a separate species with the name Trichochrysea nitidissima. The taxonomic position of the subspecies T. h. viridis is not clear, as its aedeagus was not studied: it is sometimes instead recognised as a separate species (Trichochrysea viridis), but it is possibly a synonym of T. hirta.

== Distribution ==
Trichochrysea hirta is recorded from the Malay Peninsula, Sumatra, Bali, Lombok, Java, Nias, and Sulawesi.
