= Delachaux et Niestlé =

Swiss publishing house

- Industry: Publishing
- Founded: 1882
- Founders: Adolphe Niestlé; Paul Delachaux; Eugène Delachaux
- Headquarters: Moudon, Switzerland (registered office); Paris, France (permanent establishment)
- Parent: Média-Participations (from 2017)
- Website: delachauxetniestle.com

Delachaux et Niestlé (also Delachaux & Niestlé) is a publishing house founded in Neuchâtel in 1882 by the printer Adolphe Niestlé and the publishers Paul and Eugène Delachaux. It became internationally known through the series Actualités pédagogiques et psychologiques, edited among others by Pierre Bovet and Jean Piaget. In 1993 its registered office was moved to Lausanne.

== History ==
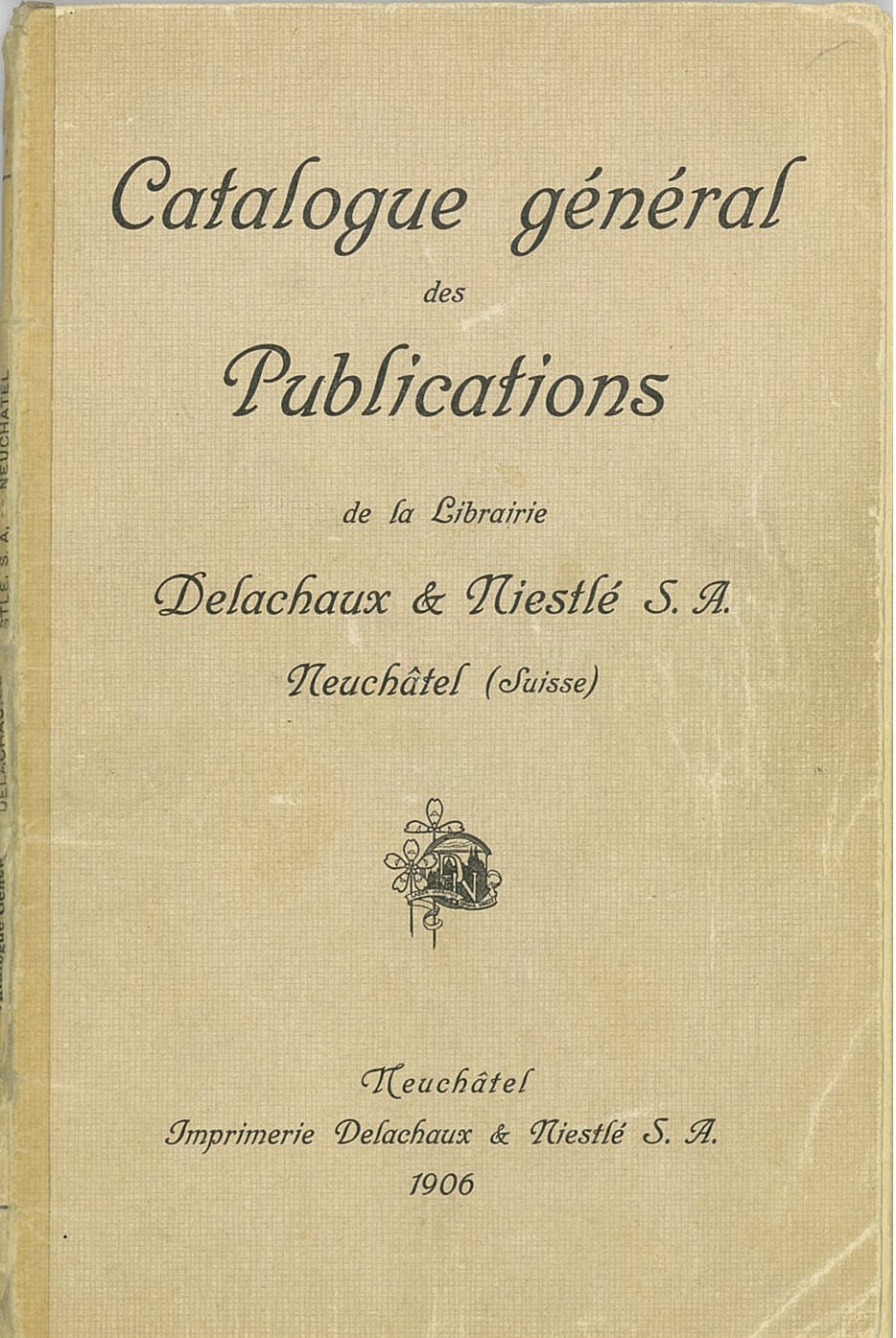
General catalogue of the firm's publications, 1906

Delachaux et Niestlé was founded in Neuchâtel in 1882 through the partnership of Adolphe Niestlé (1845–1924), a printer since 1875, and the brothers Paul (1850–1912) and Eugène (1854–1934) Delachaux, publishers. The Éditions Delachaux were already publishing books in 1861, but the partnership with Niestlé gave the business a more solid footing. In 1904 it became a joint-stock company (société anonyme). Arthur Delachaux (1874–1963), Paul's son, ran it from 1912 to 1944, together first with Adolphe Niestlé and then with Robert Niestlé, and expanded it considerably. A branch was opened in Paris in 1919.

The firm became internationally known through the series Actualités pédagogiques et psychologiques, edited among others by Pierre Bovet and Jean Piaget, and also made its name in the natural sciences and, from 1943, in theology. Under Agnès Delachaux (1903–1988), who was in charge of the publishing house from 1944, it grew considerably: it sold 300,000 volumes in 1945 and had a presence in Brussels from 1950 and in Montreal from 1960. The company nevertheless ran into structural difficulties, which led to the closure of its workshops and shops between 1974 and 1979 and, in 1974, to the takeover of the publishing house by the director of the Éditions SPES in Lausanne. In 1993 the registered office was moved from Neuchâtel to Lausanne.

== Bibliography ==
- A. Delachaux, Une vie au service de l'édition, 1982
- J. Rychner, M. Schlup (eds.), Editeurs neuchâtelois du XXe siècle, 1987, 47–58
