= Ligue pour la protection des oiseaux =

French environmental protection organization

Ligue pour la Protection des Oiseaux

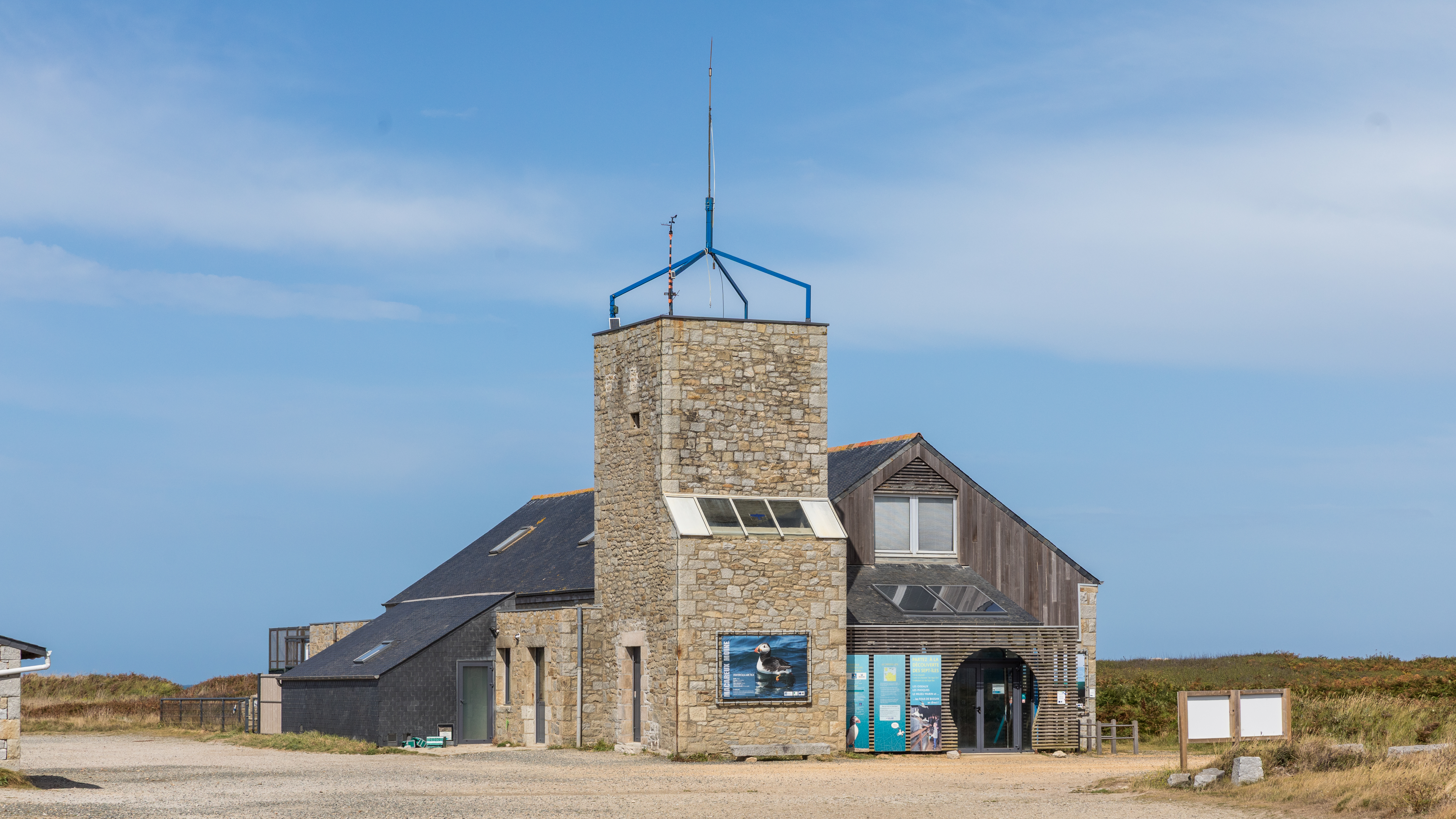
- LPO building on l'Île-Grande in 2025.
- Motto: Agir pour la biodiversité
- Types: NGO
- Aim: Nature conservation
- Headquarters: Rochefort, Charente-Maritime
- Region served: France
- Membership: 80,000 (2026)
- Chief Executives: Allain Bougrain-Dubourg
- Directors: Olivier Denoue, Vanessa Lorioux and Cédric Marteau
- Budget: 63% private financing / 37% public financing
- Employees: 270 (LPO France)
- Volunteers: 9,000

The Ligue pour la protection des oiseaux (The League for the Protection of Birds) is a French environmental protection association founded in 1912. The LPO works to improve biodiversity through the knowledge and protection of species; the development and preservation of ecosystems; raising awareness and mobilizing citizens; and supporting businesses and local authorities.

The association became a French national public interest association by decree of July 3, 1986, published in the Journal officiel on July 9, 1986. In this capacity, it is authorized to receive donations, gifts, and bequests. The LPO has been the official representative of BirdLife International in France since 1995.

The LPO manages seven wildlife rehabilitation centers: Île-Grande (Côtes-d'Armor), Clermont-Ferrand (Puy-de-Dôme), Buoux (Vaucluse), Audenge (Gironde), Castres (Tarn), Rosenwiller (Bas-Rhin), and Villeveyrac (Hérault). Additionally, it has two mobile care units stationed in La Rochelle and is part of the French Union of Rescue Centers network (UFCS).

== History ==
In 1898, a group of teachers founded the first ligue pour la protection des oiseaux (league for the protection of birds).

In 1908, Albert Chappellier, during a trip to the Sept-Îles archipelago, observed the poor condition of the puffin colony. Upon his return, he proposed the idea of creating a protected area.

In 1912, Lieutenant Hémery denounced the slaughter of puffins by hunters on the northern coasts of Brittany, with the Chemins de fer de l'Ouest organizing safaris. According to historian Rémi Luglia, the idea of dedicating a subsection of the Société nationale de protection de la nature to bird protection originated with Albert Chappellier and several colleagues from this society, including the ornithologist Louis Magaud d'Aubusson (1847–1917). Louis Magaud d'Aubusson, who is commonly recognized as the founding father of the LPO and the Sept-Îles reserve, defined its purpose: "the usefulness of birds against insects." This is why the LPO, like the Acclimatization Society, "considers it necessary to educate agricultural and rural populations so that they no longer destroy their natural helpers."

The founding of LPO in January 1912 was prompted by the non-enforcement of the 1902 law on protecting birds useful to agriculture, decided in Paris. Its first president was Louis Magaud d'Aubusson. From the same effort, in September 1912, the Réserve naturelle nationale des Sept-Îles was created, the first bird reserve in France (privately managed until 1976).

In 1923, Louis Ternier (1861–1943) resigned and Jean Delacour (1890–1985) took over the leadership of the LPO. He brought in new members, including women. These women brought a complementary perspective to bird protection, both in how birds are viewed and how they are protected. While women had been completely absent in the 19th century, one of them, Alexandrine Feuillée-Billot, stood out by serving as the administrative secretary for more than 40 years, and representing the various movements favorable to bird protection in the interwar period. As a female naturalist, she belonged to several learned societies; her works were praised by ornithologists, and others, which was exceptional in France for that era.

In 1950, the International Convention for Bird Protection held in Paris established the general principle of bird conservation, departing from the utilitarian approach to their protection.

Managing and monitoring the Réserve naturelle nationale des Sept-Îles, along with denouncing the trade of bird feathers, were the primary missions of the LPO until 1970. At that time, the concept of nature protection underwent a shift towards protecting habitats and improving living conditions for species.

The LPO experienced a new wave of growth and definitively shifted towards scientific activities and the creation of nature reserves. By 1977, the LPO had 2,500 members and was recognized as a national reference association. In the following years, there was a steady increase in conservation actions and environmental education initiatives. The association became a nationally recognized French public interest organization by decree of July 3, 1986, published in the Journal officiel on July 9, 1986. In 1990, the first LPO branch is established in Lorraine. From that point onward, the LPO constitutes a national network of departmental and regional branches, all governed by the statutes of the "National LPO."

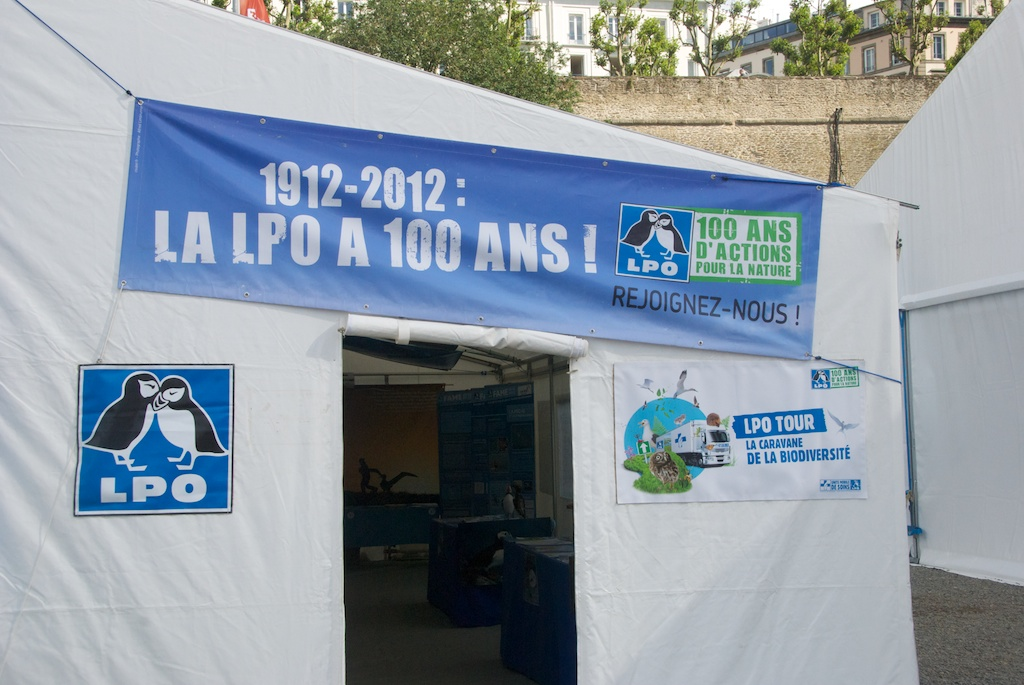
Events for the organization's 100th anniversary.

The LPO was included in the NGO transparency barometer from its first edition in 2008. It has been listed in the European Union's transparency register since 2014.

In 2012, as part of its centennial celebrations, the LPO organized France's first Birdfair birdwatching event in Paimbœuf, inspired by the British Birdwatching Fair.

On November 2, 2016, the LPO established a scientific and technical committee. The president of this committee is Patrick Grillas, who is also the director of a research institute located in Camargue.

In 2018, the LPO was authorized to participate in debates on the environment within national consultative bodies.

In 2019, the LPO passed the 50,000-member milestone.

Its logo features two puffins, referencing the first action that led to the creation of the association in 1912.

The LPO is represented across nearly the entirety of France through local associations, groups, and branches. This network works to advance knowledge and conservation efforts for birdlife and biodiversity.

== Presidents and Directors ==
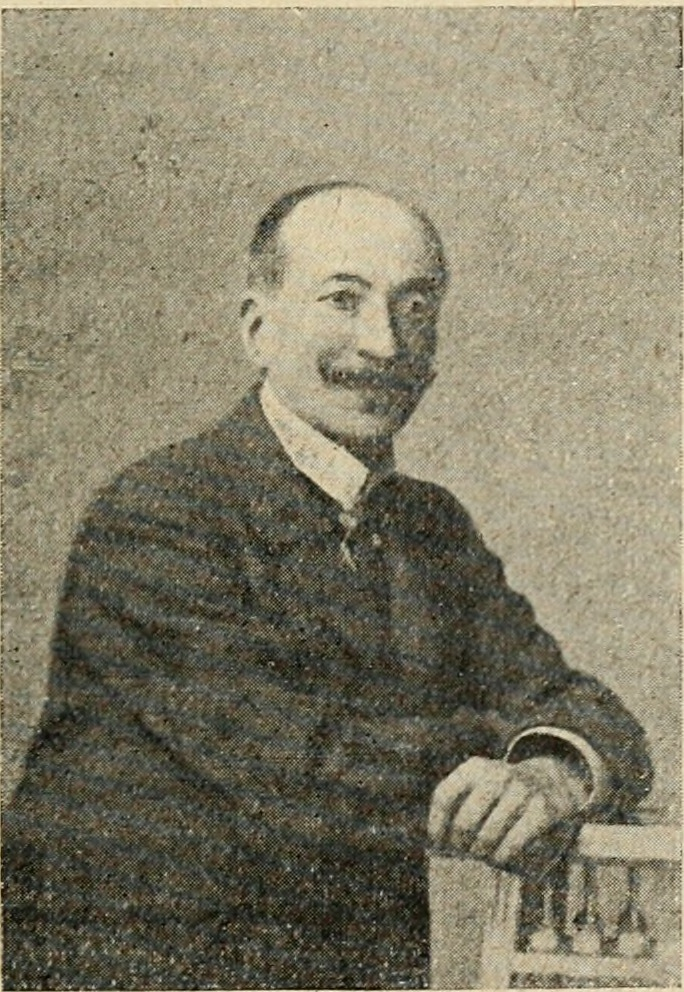
Louis Magaud d'Aubusson, the first President of the LPO.

- Presidents:
  - 1912 to 1917: Louis Magaud d'Aubusson (1847–1917)
  - 1919 to 1921: Louis Ternier (d) (1861–1943)
  - 1921 to 1976: Jean Delacour (1890–1985)
  - 1976 to 1978: Colonel Philippe Milon (1908–1992)
  - 1978 to 1986: Antoine Reille (1942-), he remains honorary national president
  - since 1986: Allain Bougrain-Dubourg (1948-).
- Directors General:
  - 1977 to 2014: Michel Métais, first Director General
  - 2014 to 2022: Yves Verilhac
  - 2022 to July 2023: Matthieu Orphelin
  - since January 2024: Olivier Denoue, Vanessa Lorioux and Cédric Marteau

== Growth of the network ==
The LPO consists of various structures advocating for shared interests and pursuing a coordinated policy. The LPO network is made up of LPO France and local associations spread throughout the country, mobilized for the protection of biodiversity. This network has gradually developed over the past thirty years through the creation or integration of new structures, following the wishes of members and volunteers who want to take action for biodiversity protection in departments where no LPO representation existed.

=== Local branches ===
A local LPO branch is a nature protection group governed by the Association loi de 1901 that has entered into an agreement with the LPO, particularly for local representation, and is designated as a local LPO branch followed by the relevant geographic area (region or department). The agreement specifies the commitments between the two organisations: having an identical statutory objective (protection of biodiversity) and sharing members, among other things. A local LPO branch is an independent legal entity from LPO France, with its own legal and financial autonomy.

- LPO Alsace
- LPO Anjou
- LPO Aquitaine
- LPO Auvergne-Rhône-Alpes
- LPO Bourgogne-Franche-Comté
- LPO Bretagne
- LPO Champagne-Ardenne
- LPO Île-de-France
- LPO Limousin
- LPO Loire-Atlantique
- LPO Meurthe-et-Moselle
- LPO Meuse
- LPO Moselle
- LPO Nord
- LPO Normandie
- LPO Occitanie
- LPO Pas-de-Calais
- LPO Poitou-Charentes
- LPO Provence-Alpes-Côte d'Azur
- LPO Sarthe
- LPO Vendée

== Actions and communication ==
=== Partnerships ===
The LPO has partnership agreements with public entities (French State, European Union, regional governments, etc.), private entities (businesses), and other nature conservation organisations. The diversity of these partnerships allows it to carry out a wide range of actions in support of biodiversity.

The LPO is committed to implementing the preservation of animals within Plan de restauration (national action plans) aimed at protecting endangered species. It participates in project calls from the European LIFE program, for example, to protect the European mink in Poitou-Charentes.

The organisation is involved in natural habitat management programs, both inland and coastal, with the help of the Natura 2000 network.

Des Terres et des Ailes is a program launched by the LPO and supported by the Chamber of Agriculture in France, aiming to reintroduce nature into rural areas and agricultural operations through defined actions.

With the "Nature en ville" program, the LPO works alongside urban development professionals to design Ecodistricts. It offers fauna and flora inventories, advises on planning and management, or sets up refuges to optimize all spaces for welcoming biodiversity.

=== Raising awareness and citizen mobilization ===
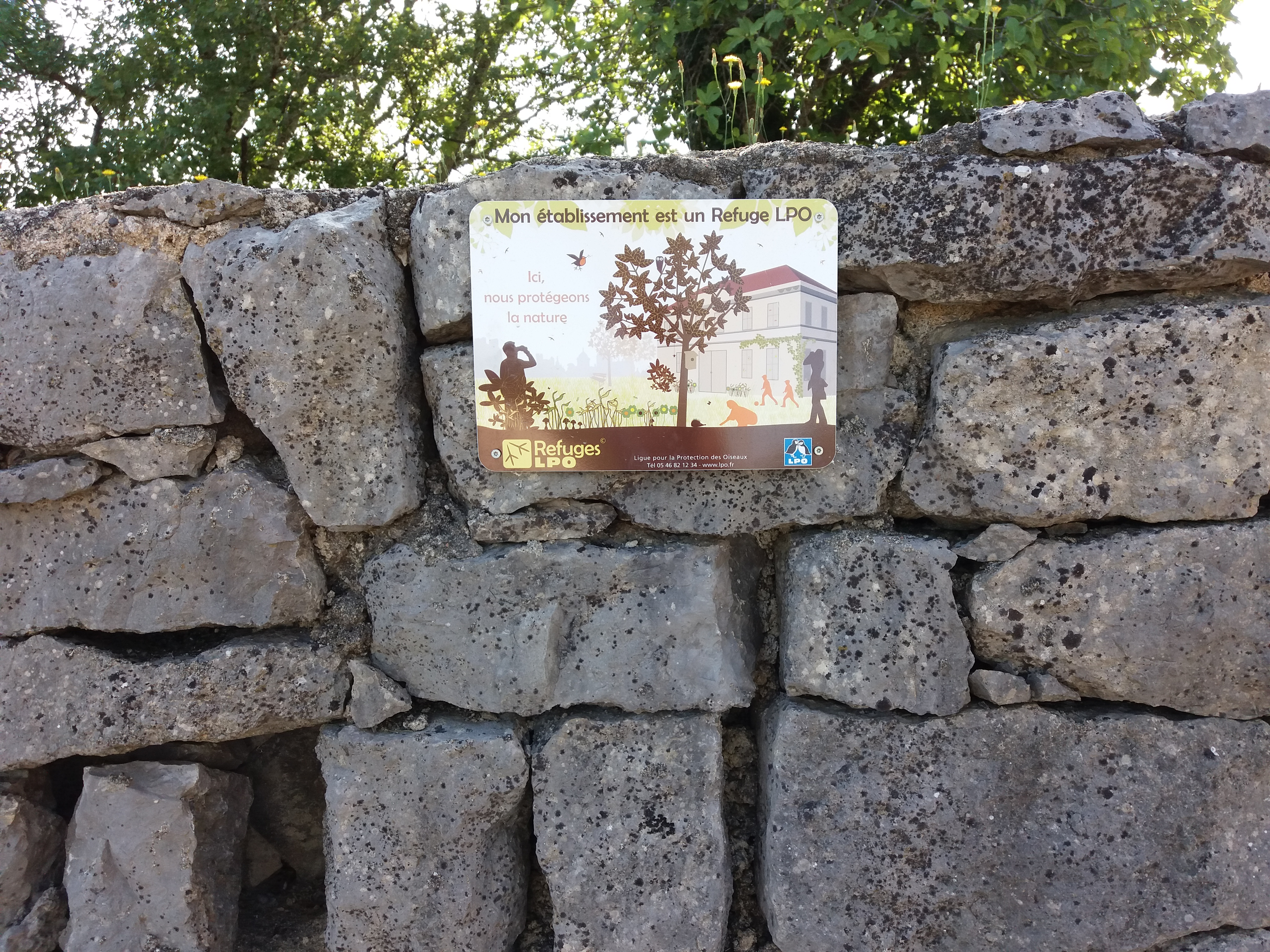
The LPO Refuge of the Hanging Gardens of Recatadou in Labeaume.

The organization offers various levels of engagement: membership, donations, and a range of volunteer activities, including field surveys, nature conservation projects, event organizing and/or assistance in wildlife rehabilitation centers.

The LPO Refuges program, launched in 1921, offers individuals, businesses, communities, and public institutions the opportunity to take concrete action for biodiversity. An LPO Refuge can be a public area (park, communal garden) or private property (garden, courtyard, terrace, balcony), where the owner commits to preserving and protecting nature in its broadest sense: wildlife, plants, soil, and the environment. During its centennial in 2021, the LPO Refuges program had over 40,000 members in France, representing an area of more than 50,000 hectares of preserved spaces.

The LPO publishes three series of magazines for a broad audience. Created in 1985, "L'Oiseau Mag" is aimed at adults, while its counterpart "L’Oiseau Mag Junior" is written for a younger audience. Since 1998, "L'Oiseau Mag" includes an annual special issue dedicated exclusively to birds of prey. The scientific journal "Ornithos" provides a catalog of ornithological studies.

Since 2006, the LPO annually awards the "Golden Puffin" to individuals who have distinguished themselves in promoting biodiversity and bird protection.

Supported by LPO France since July 1, 2017, Visionature is a citizen science program where about fifty naturalist organizations have united to share information and protect biodiversity. The naturalist portal Faune-France from the program allows observation data to be entered into a database whose contents and reproduction rights are owned by the organization.

In 2018, the LPO launched "MOOC Ornitho", an online open course dedicated to ornithology, developed in partnership with the Belgian nature conservation association "Natagora."

Throughout the year, the LPO offers numerous nature outings and trips, both in France and abroad, with the aim of discovering nature.

== Publications ==
- 1912-1925: Bulletin de la Ligue française pour la protection des oiseaux.
- 1926-1940: Bulletin de la Fédération des groupements français pour la protection des oiseaux ISSN 1162-4663.
- 1947-1958: Le Journal des oiseaux : organe des sociétés sérinophiles et de tous les amateurs et éleveurs d'oiseaux de volière, de chasse et de b asse-cour : organe d'action internationale pour la protection des insectivores utiles à l'agriculture, des sociétés sérinophiles et de tous les amate urs et éleveurs d'oiseaux de volière, de chasse et de basse-cour (partial set from the previous publication).
- 1958-1961: La Revue des oiseaux : revue de la Ligue française pour la protection des oiseaux ISSN 1162-4698.
- 1961-1964: La Nouvelle revue des oiseaux : organe officiel de la Ligue française pour la protection des oiseaux ISSN 1162-4701.
- 1964-1969: Le Journal des oiseaux ISSN 0181-8902.
- 1965-1967: L'Homme et l'Oiseau ISSN 0374-809X — This review then merges with Le Courrier de la Nature and is published by Société nationale de protection de la nature under the title Le Courrier de la Nature, l'Homme et l'oiseau before becoming in 1977 Le Courrier de la Nature.
- since 1985: L'Oiseau magazine : revue nature de la Ligue pour la protection des oiseaux ISSN 0297-5785. Quarterly.
- since 1994: Ornithos : revue d'ornithologie de terrain ISSN 1254-2962. Bimonthly.
- since 2009: L'Oiseau magazine junior : la revue nature LPO pour les 7-12 ans ISSN 2109-1447 . Quarterly.

== See also ==
=== Bibliography ===
- Rémi Luglia (2015). "La singularité de la LPO". Des savants pour protéger la nature: La Société d'acclimatation (1854-1960). Rennes: Presses Universitaires de Rennes. pp. 283–306. doi:10.4000/books.pur.89133.
- Valérie Chansigaud (2012). Des hommes et des oiseaux; une histoire de la protection des oiseaux. Delachaux & Niestle. p. 224. ISBN 9782603018446.
- Antoine Cadi; Allain Bougrain Dubourg; Philippe de Grissac; Michel Métais (2012). Protéger les oiseaux: un siècle d'actions avec la Ligue pour la protection des oiseaux (in French). Rennes: Ouest-France. p. 121. ISBN 978-2-7373-5862-3.
- Patrick Janin (1989). "Aux origines de la protection de la nature et du droit de l'environnement: à propos d'un ouvrage ancien : la protection des oiseaux d'Émile Oustalet". Revue juridique de l'Environnement. No. 14. pp. 33–38.

=== Related articles ===
- Bird conservation
- Nature conservation
- BirdLife International
- Jean Dorst
- Important Bird Area
- Albert Chappellier
- Audubon

=== External links ===
- Union Française des Centres de Sauvegarde de la faune sauvage (UFCS). Centres dans votre région
- BirdFair
- "France - Ligue pour la Protection des Oiseaux (LPO)". BirdLife International.
