= Lucignolo capensis =

Scientific classification
- Kingdom: Animalia
- Phylum: Arthropoda
- Clade: Pancrustacea
- Class: Insecta
- Order: Coleoptera
- Suborder: Polyphaga
- Infraorder: Cucujiformia
- Family: Chrysomelidae
- Subfamily: Eumolpinae
- Tribe: Euryopini
- Genus: Lucignolo; Zoia, 2010
- Species: L. capensis

Binomial name
- Lucignolo capensis (Lefèvre, 1890)

Synonyms
- Trichostola capensis Lefèvre, 1890

Species of leaf beetle from South Africa

Lucignolo capensis is a species of leaf beetle endemic to South Africa, and the only member of the genus Lucignolo. It was first described by Édouard Lefèvre in 1890 as a species of the genus Trichostola. It was later found to be closely related to Odontionopa, and was placed in its own genus by Stefano Zoia in 2010.

The genus is named after Lucignolo (or "Candlewick"), a character from Carlo Collodi's The Adventures of Pinocchio. This name refers to the shiny, delicate body of L. capensis.
