= Philippe Milon =

French naturalist (1908–1992)

- Born: Philippe Eugène Milon; January 21, 1908; 17th arrondissement of Paris
- Died: September 24, 1992 (aged 84); Lannion
- Occupations: Naturalist, Ornithologist

Colonel Philippe Milon, born on January 21, 1908 in Paris and died on September 24, 1992 in Lannion, was a French officer and naturalist.

== Bibliography ==
Born in Paris but of Breton origin, he graduated from the École spéciale militaire de Saint-Cyr and served as a colonial officer in Africa (notably Madagascar). Passionate about birds since his youth, he became president of the Ligue pour la protection des oiseaux (League for the Protection of Birds) in 1962, after thirty years of service, while also serving as the conservator of the Sept-Îles bird reserve which he founded.

He played a decisive role in the creation of the LPO's journal, L'Homme et l'Oiseau, established in 1964. He became known for his fight against marine pollution, notably in 1967 with the Torrey Canyon oil spill, which led to the establishment of an LPO station on Grande-Île in Sept-Îles to serve as a care center for oil covered birds, and again in 1978 with the oil spill caused by the Amoco Cadiz.

He was interested in the birds of Madagascar and Indochina, and also traveled to the Crozet Islands and the Kerguelen Islands.

== Writings ==
- La Mort sur l'île, 1972, 108 p.
- Philippe Milon, Renaud Paulian, Jean-Jacques Petter et Georges Randrianasolo, Oiseaux, 1956
- Philippe Milon, Jean-Jacques Petter, Georges Randrianasolo et Renaud Paulian, Faune de Madagascar, 1973, 263 p.
