= Fernand Nathan =

French editor (1858–1947)

- Born: Clément Alphonse Fernand Cahen; 27 January 1858; Passy
- Died: 1 January 1947 (aged 88); 7th arrondissement of Paris
- Education: High school diploma
- Occupation: Publisher
- Awards: Officer of the Legion of Honor (1931); Chevalier of the Legion of Honour (1920); Officier de l'Instruction publique

Fernand Nathan, born on January 27, 1858 and died on March 1, 1947, with the birth name Fernand Clément Alphonse Cahen, also known by the pseudonym Jean Perrot, was a French publisher and founder of the publishing house Nathan.

== Biography ==
Fernand Nathan was born in Passy (now Paris) in 1858 into a Jewish family from Lorraine. His father was a horse merchant.

Nathan first worked for the Parisian bookseller and publisher Charles Delagrave. Then, on June 8, 1881, at the age of 23, he partnered with Jean-Baptiste Fauvé (1834-1893) to found the Librairie classique Nicolas Fauvé et Fernand Nathan, located at 18 Rue de Condé in the 6th arrondissement of Paris. In 1884, Nathan bought out his partner's shares, becoming the sole owner of the publishing house. The specialization in educational publishing came at a very favorable time for Fernand Nathan: indeed, the Jules Ferry laws and the reforms of the educational system during the first decades of the French Third Republic offered important opportunities for educational publishing.

During World War II, Fernand Nathan, due to his Jewish origins, was a victim of the antisemitic laws targeting Jews in France. He had to flee and hide but managed, before doing so, to entrust the management of the company to a trusted employee. A caretaker was appointed by the occupying authorities, and then the company was "Aryanized". Its management was entrusted to a group of French publishers, with the family Nathan's consent. Upon liberation, Fernand Nathan resumed control of his publishing house, which had thus been saved during the war.
