= Jacques Berlioz =

French zoologist and ornithologist

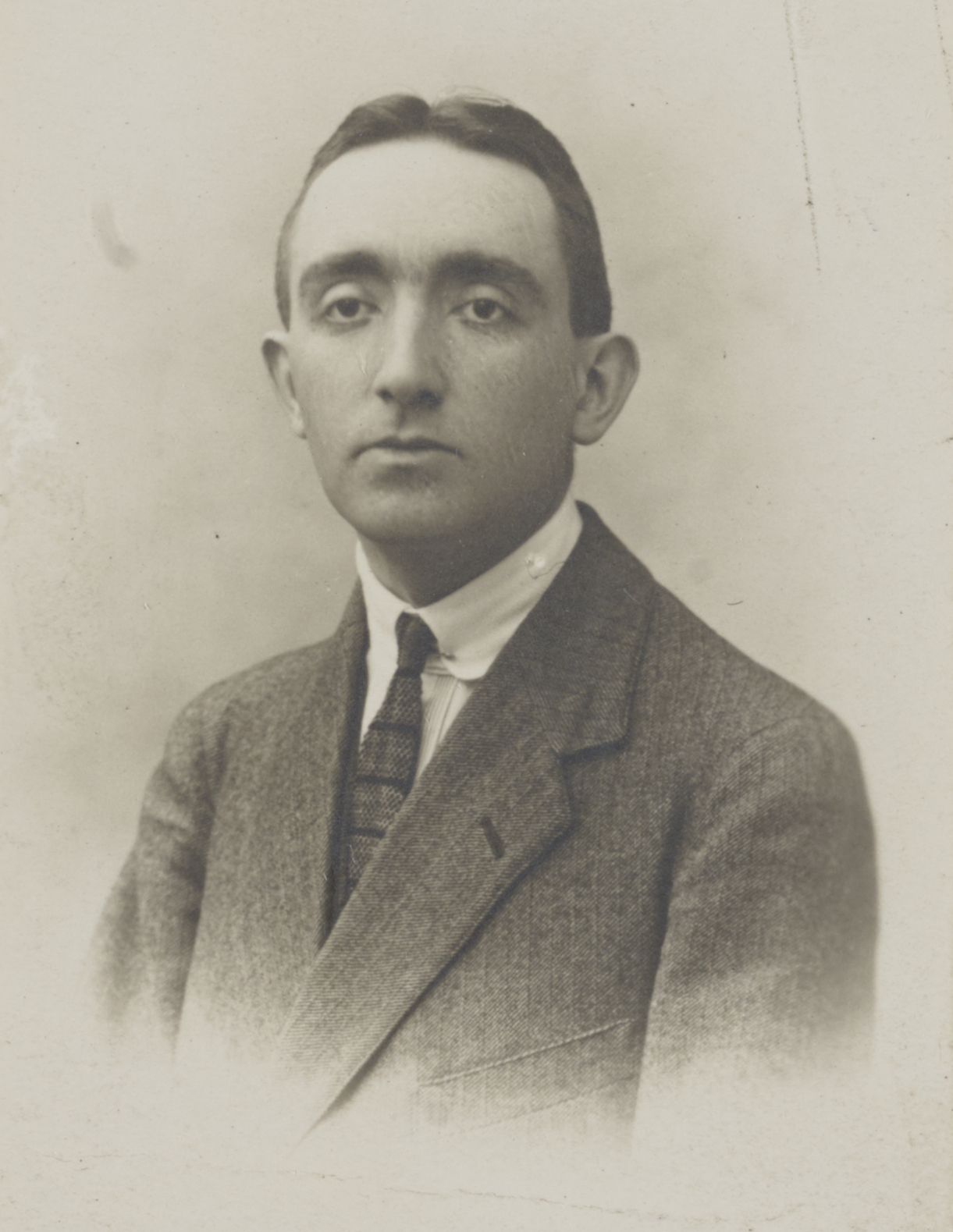
Portrait c. 1923

Jacques Berlioz (9 December 1891, Paris – 21 December 1975) was a French zoologist and ornithologist, specializing in hummingbirds. He was a grand-nephew of composer Hector Berlioz (1803–1869).

Berlioz was born in Paris, where the family home stood behind Sainte-Trinité and took an interest in natural history from his early childhood. The family included many artists and scientists and his grand uncle was the famous composer Hector Berlioz. He studied medicine and pharmaceutical chemistry in which he received a doctorate in 1917. He then worked at the Muséum national d'Histoire naturelle in Paris as an assistant in the department of entomology, moving to the department of mammals and birds in 1920. He became an assistant curator after some years and a chief curator in 1949 with the title of professor. He continued to work here until his retirement in 1962.

Berlioz travelled to Madagascar and Vietnam on collection trips with Jean Delacour between 1925 and 1932. Among his writings, were three chapters on taxonomy, distribution and migration in Traité de Zoologie (vol. 15, 19.50, pp. 845–1088) apart from papers on the hummingbirds. For many years he was an editor of L'Oiseau et la Revue Française d'Ornithologie.

Apart from natural history, he also took an interest in photography, was a good artist and a talented musician. Berlioz was an officer of the Légion d'honneur, an honorary member of the American Ornithologists' Union, the British Ornithologists' Union, the Deutsche Ornithologen-Gesellschaft, the Zoological Society of London, and the Société de France Ornitholoque.

== Written works ==
- La vie des colibris (Paris) Gallimard, 1944 - The life of hummingbirds.
- Oiseaux de la Réunion (Paris) Larose, 1946 - Birds of Réunion.
- Les oiseaux (Paris) Presses universitaires de France, 1962 - The birds.
