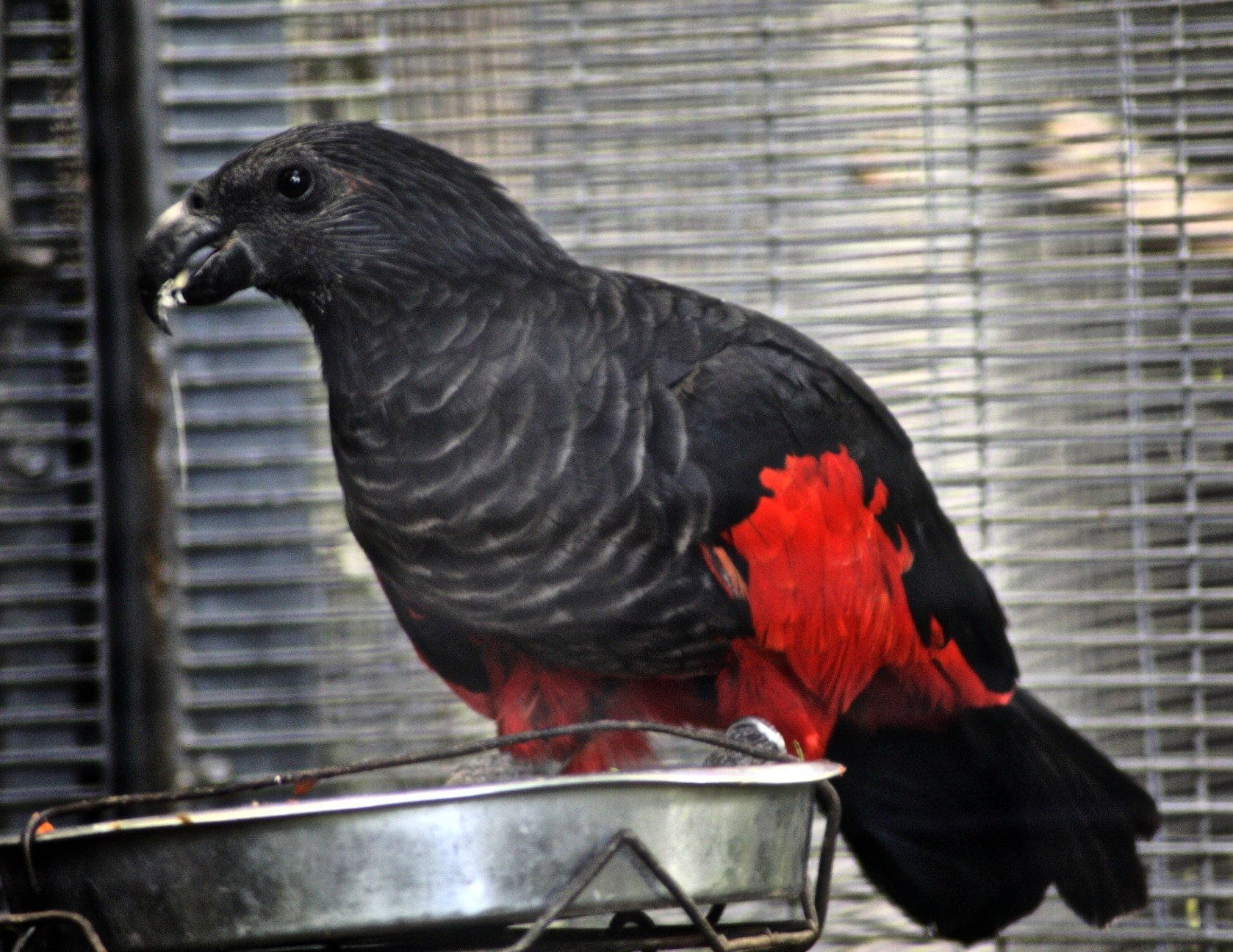
- Pesquet's parrot (Psittrichas fulgidus)

Scientific classification
- Kingdom: Animalia
- Phylum: Chordata
- Class: Aves
- Order: Psittaciformes
- Superfamily: Psittacoidea
- Family: Psittrichasiidae; Boetticher, 1959

Subfamilies
- Coracopsinae; Psittrichasinae

= Psittrichasiidae =

Family of birds

Psittrichasiidae is a family of birds belonging to the superfamily of the true parrots (Psittacoidea). It is a very small family, the smallest of the three families of the true parrots. It is divided into two subfamilies: Psittrichasinae and Coracopsinae, that contain a single genus each. The first contains a single species, native to New Guinea, and the second contains four living species distributed throughout Madagascar and other islands of the Indian Ocean.

== Genera ==
The family Psittrichasiidae contains two subfamilies:

Subfamily Psittrichasinae:

- Genus Psittrichas
  - Psittrichas fulgidus - Pesquet's parrot

Subfamily Coracopsinae

- Genus Coracopsis
  - Coracopsis barklyi - Seychelles black parrot
  - Coracopsis nigra - Lesser vasa parrot
  - Coracopsis vasa - Greater vasa parrot
  - Coracopsis sibilans - Comoros black parrot (split from Coracopsis nigra)

Recent studies indicate that the extinct Mascarene parrot (Mascarinus mascarinus) was closely related to the members of Coracopsis.
