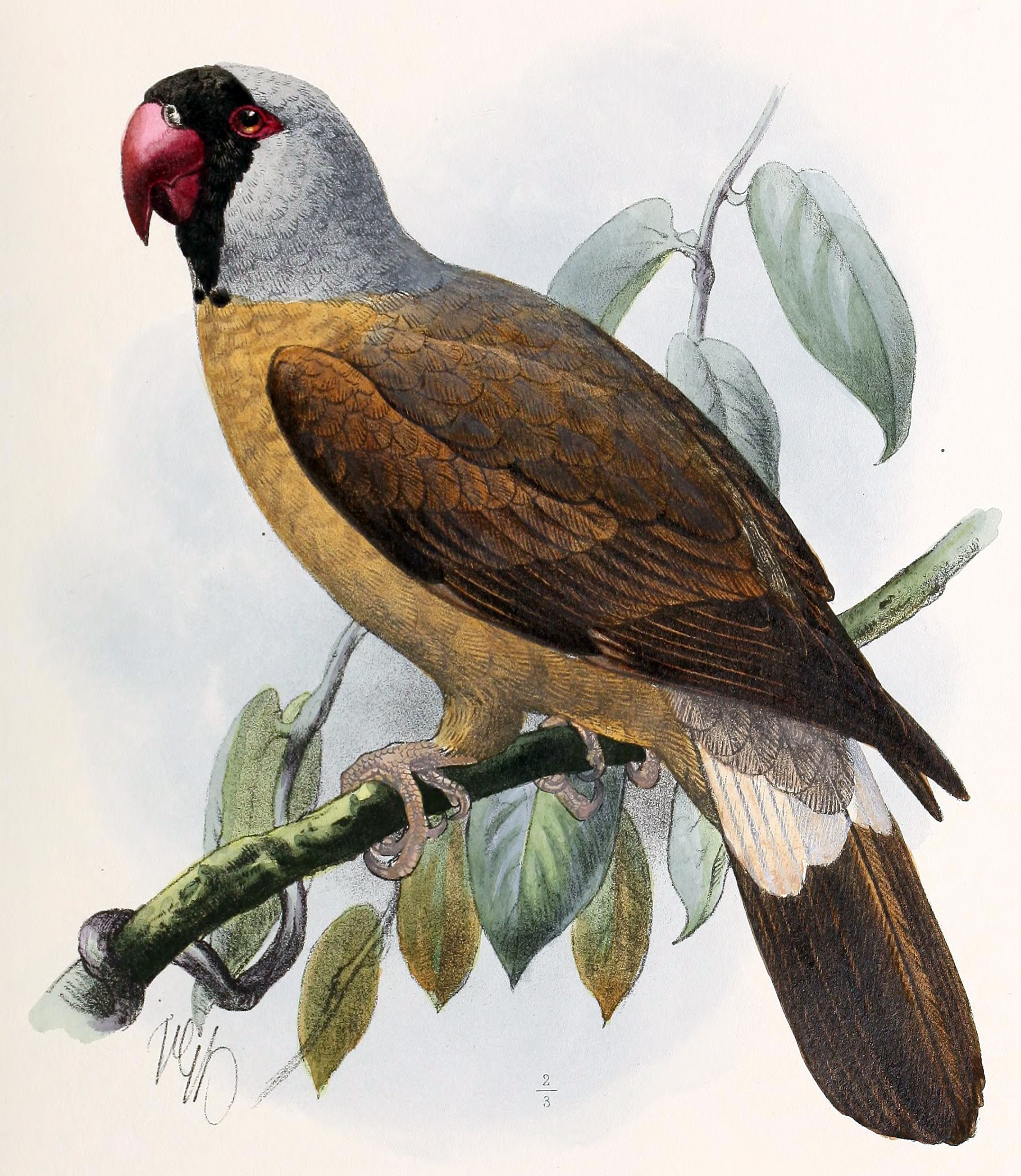
- 1893 illustration by John Gerrard Keulemans, based on the specimen in Muséum National d'Histoire Naturelle in Paris, one of two in existence

Conservation status
- Extinct (1834) (IUCN 3.1)

Scientific classification
- Kingdom: Animalia
- Phylum: Chordata
- Class: Aves
- Order: Psittaciformes
- Family: Psittaculidae
- Subfamily: Psittaculinae
- Genus: †Mascarinus; Lesson, 1830
- Species: †M. mascarinus

Binomial name
- †Mascarinus mascarinus (Linnaeus, 1771)
- Location of Réunion (encircled)

Synonyms
- List: Psittacus mascarin Linnaeus, 1771; Mascarinus madagascariensis Lesson, 1831; Coracopsis mascarina (Wagler, 1832); Mascarinus obscurus Bonaparte, 1854; Vaza mascarina (Schlegel, 1864); Psittacus madagascarensis (Finsch, 1868); Psittacus mascarenus Finsch, 1868; Coracopsis obscura (Gray, 1870); Psittacus madagascariensis (Pelzeln, 1873); Coracopsis mascarinus (Newton & Newton, 1876); Mascarinus duboisi Forbes, 1879; Mascarinus mascarin (Linnaeus, 1771)

= Mascarene parrot =

Extinct species of bird from Réunion

The Mascarene parrot or mascarin (Mascarinus mascarinus) is an extinct species of parrot that was endemic to the Mascarene island of Réunion in the western Indian Ocean. The taxonomic relationships of this species have been subject to debate; it has historically been grouped with either the Psittaculini parrots or the vasa parrots, with the latest genetic study favouring the former group.

The Mascarene parrot was 35 cm (14 in) in length with a large red bill and long, rounded tail feathers. Its legs were red, and it had naked red skin around the eyes and nostrils. It had a black facial mask and partially white tail feathers, but the colouration of the body, wings and head in the living bird is unclear. Descriptions from life indicate the body and head were ash grey, and the white part of the tail had two dark central feathers. In contrast, stuffed specimens and old descriptions based on them indicate that the body was brown and the head bluish. This may be due to the specimens having changed colour as a result of ageing and exposure to light. Very little is known about the bird in life.

The Mascarene parrot was first mentioned in 1674, and live specimens were later brought to Europe, where they lived in captivity. The species was scientifically described in 1771. Only two stuffed specimens exist today, in Paris and Vienna. The date and cause of extinction for the Mascarene parrot is unclear. The latest account, from 1834, is considered dubious, so it is probable that the species became extinct prior to 1800, and may have become extinct even earlier.

== Taxonomy ==
The Mascarene parrot was first mentioned by the French traveller Sieur Dubois in his 1674 travelogue from the Mascarene Island of Réunion, and was only described a few times from life afterwards. At least three live specimens were brought to France in the late 18th century and kept in captivity, two of which were described while alive. Today, two stuffed specimens exist; the holotype, specimen MNHN 211, which is in the Muséum National d'Histoire Naturelle in Paris, while the other, specimen NMW 50.688, is in the Naturhistorisches Museum in Vienna. The latter specimen was bought from the Leverian Museum during a sale in London in 1806. A third stuffed specimen existed around the turn of the 18th century. The Mascarene parrot was scientifically described as Psittacus mascarinus (abbreviated as "mascarin") by the Swedish zoologist Carl Linnaeus in 1771. This name was first used by the French zoologist Mathurin Jacques Brisson in 1760 but was not intended as a scientific name. The name is a reference to the Mascarene Islands, which were themselves named after their Portuguese discoverer, Pedro Mascarenhas.

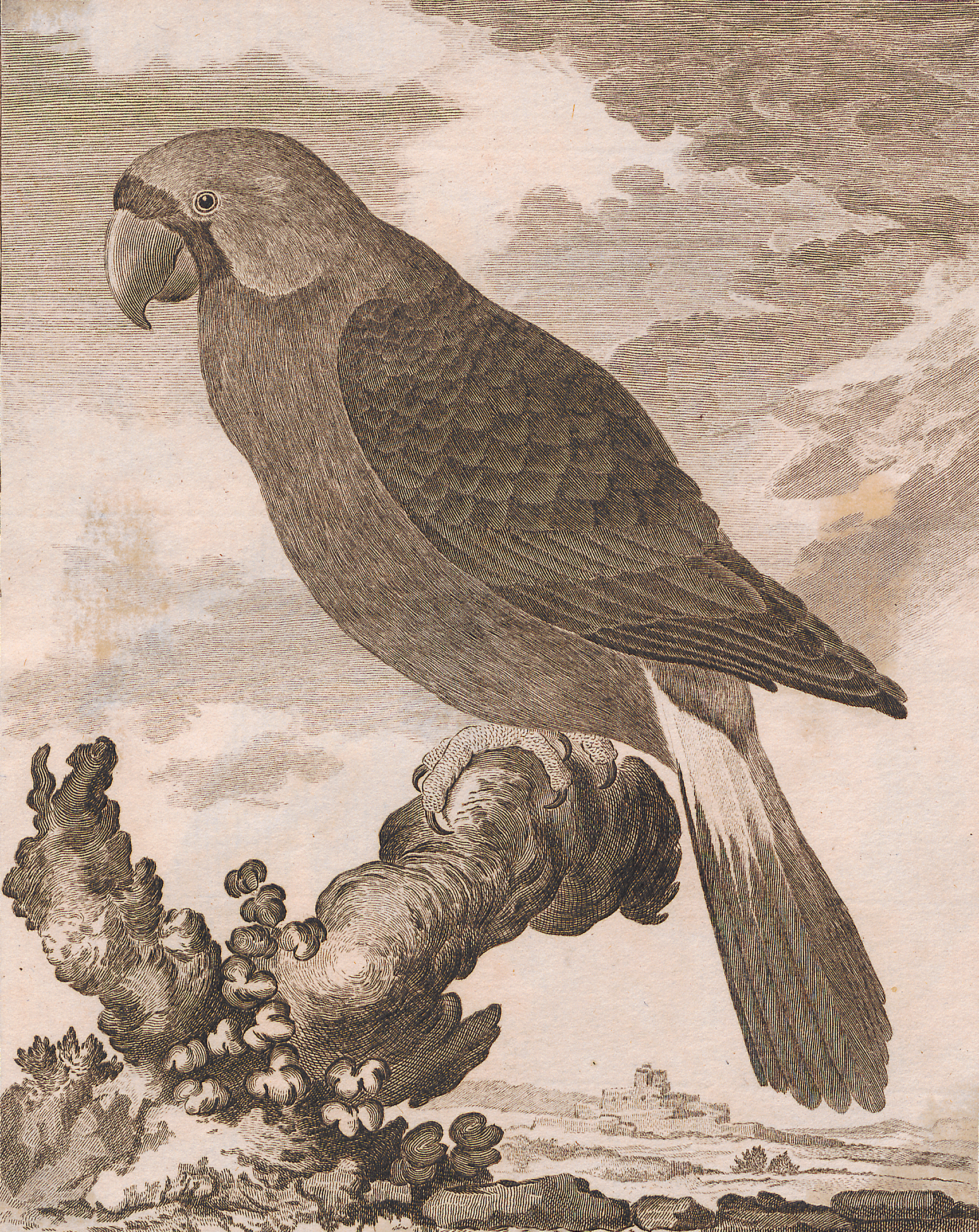
Plate showing this parrot from Comte de Buffon's encyclopaedia Histoire Naturelle, 1700s

Early writers claimed the Mascarene parrot was found on Madagascar, an idea that led the French naturalist René Primevère Lesson to coin the junior synonym Mascarinus madagascariensis in 1831. His new genus name prevailed and, when the Italian zoologist Tommaso Salvadori combined it with the earlier specific name in 1891, it became a tautonym (a scientific name in which the two parts are identical). Lesson also included species of the Tanygnathus and Psittacula genera in Mascarinus, but this was not accepted by other writers. The following year, the German herpetologist Johann Georg Wagler erected the genus Coracopsis for the Mascarene parrot (which became Coracopsis mascarina under this system) and the lesser vasa parrot (Coracopsis nigra). The English zoologist William Alexander Forbes, believing that mascarinus was invalid as a specific name, since it was identical to the genus name, coined the new name Mascarinus duboisi in 1879, in honour of Dubois.

An unidentified dark parrot seen alive by the Swedish naturalist Fredrik Hasselqvist in Africa was given the name Psittacus obscurus by Linnaeus in 1758, who again synonymised it with the Mascarene parrot in 1766. Because of this association, some authors believed it was from the Mascarene Islands as well, but this dark parrot's description differs from that of the Mascarene parrot. This disagreement led some authors to use now-invalid combinations of the scientific names, such as Mascarinus obscurus and Coracopsis obscura. The unidentified parrot may have been a grey parrot (Psittacus erithacus) instead. Another unidentified parrot specimen, this one brown and housed in Cabinet du Roi, was described by the French naturalist Comte de Buffon in 1779 under his entry for the Mascarene parrot, in which he pointed out similarities and differences between the two. In 2007, the English palaeontologist Julian Hume suggested the possibility that this might have been a lesser vasa parrot, if not a discoloured old Mascarene grey parakeet (Psittacula bensoni). The specimen is now lost. English zoologist George Robert Gray assigned some eclectus parrot (Eclectus roratus) subspecies from the Moluccas to Mascarinus in the 1840s, but this idea was soon dismissed by other writers.

Subfossil parrot remains were later excavated from grottos on Réunion and reported in 1996. X-rays of the two existing stuffed Mascarene parrots made it possible to compare the remaining bones with the subfossils and showed these were intermediate in measurements in comparison to the modern specimens. The lesser vasa parrot was introduced to Réunion as early as 1780 but, though the subfossil parrot bones were similar to that species in some aspects, they were more similar to those of the Mascarene parrot and considered to belong to it.

The binomial name was emended from M. mascarinus to M. mascarin by the IOC World Bird List in 2016, to conform with how other species epithets by Linnaeus have been treated. In 2020, the International Commission on Zoological Nomenclature conserved the name M. mascarinus as a justified emendation of the original spelling.

=== Evolution ===
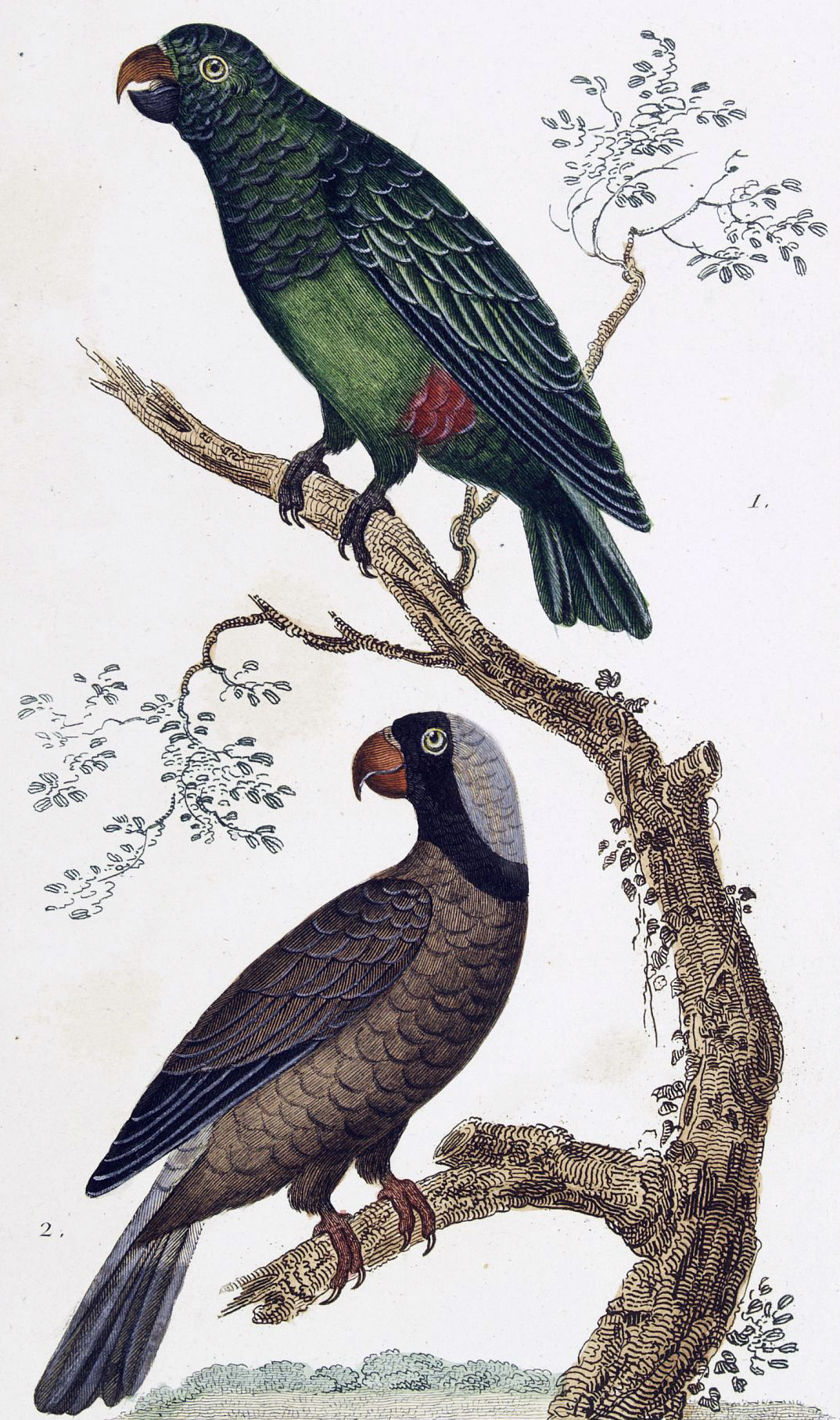
1850 illustration by Jean-Baptiste Massard with another parrot above

The affinities of the Mascarene parrot are unclear, and two hypotheses have competed since the mid-19th century. Some authors grouped it with the Coracopsinae (of African origin) due to its dark plumage, and others with the Psittaculinae parrots (of Asian origin) based on the large red beak, a feature which is diagnostic for that group. Its plumage pattern was mostly atypical for a psittaculine, though other members have black facial patterns. Although little is known about most extinct parrot species of the Mascarenes, subfossil remains show that they shared common features, such as enlarged heads and jaws, reduced pectoral bones, and robust leg bones. Hume supported their common origin in the radiation of the Psittaculini tribe based on morphological features and the fact that Psittacula parrots have managed to colonise many isolated islands in the Indian Ocean.

Sea levels were lower during the Pleistocene, so it was possible for species to colonise the Mascarene Islands from other areas. As suggested by the British ecologist Anthony S. Cheke and Hume in 2008, the Psittaculini could have invaded the area several times, as many of the species were so specialised that they may have evolved significantly on hotspot islands before the Mascarenes emerged from the sea. In 1999, the French palaeontologist Cécile Mourer-Chauviré and colleagues pointed out that Réunion is 3 million years old, which is enough time for new genera to evolve, but many endemics would have been wiped out by eruptions of the volcano Piton des Neiges between 300,000 and 180,000 years ago. Most recent and extant species would therefore probably be descendants of birds which had recolonised the island from Africa or Madagascar after this event. If the Mascarene parrot had in fact evolved into a distinct genus on Réunion prior to the volcanic eruption, it would have been one of the few survivors of this extinction event.

A 2011 genetic study by the British geneticist Samit Kundu and colleagues (which sampled the Paris specimen) found that the Mascarene parrot was grouped among the subspecies of the lesser vasa parrot from Madagascar and nearby islands and therefore not related to the Psittacula parrots. It also found that the Mascarene parrot line diverged 4.6 to 9 million years ago, prior to the formation of Réunion, indicating this must have happened elsewhere. In 2012, Leo Joseph and colleagues acknowledged the finding but pointed out that the sample might have been damaged and that further testing was needed before the issue could be fully resolved. They also noted that if Mascarinus was confirmed to be embedded within the genus Coracopsis, the latter would become a junior synonym, since the former name is older. In 2012, Hume expressed surprise at these findings due to the anatomical similarities between the Mascarene parrot and other parrots from the Mascarene islands that are believed to be psittaculines. He also pointed out that there is no fossil evidence found on other islands to support the hypothesis that the species evolved elsewhere before reaching Réunion.

In 2017, the German biologist Lars Podsiadlowski and colleagues sampled the Vienna specimen for a new genetic study and found that the Mascarene parrot was indeed part of the Psittacula group as suggested by Hume, clustering with the extinct Seychelles parakeet (P. wardi) and Asian subspecies of the Alexandrine parakeet (P. eupatria). The Mascarene parrot was therefore interpreted as having descended from an ancestral lineage of Alexandrine parakeets that had dispersed from Asia towards the Mascarene islands across the Indian Ocean. The researchers suggested that the 2011 genetic study had probably used a composite of sequences from two other parrot species sampled for the study (including a lesser vasa parrot), a result of contamination during laboratory procedures. The 2017 study also found that the parrots of the genus Tanygnathus were grouped among Psittacula parrots, and proposed that Tanygnathus and Mascarinus should therefore be merged into the genus Psittacula.

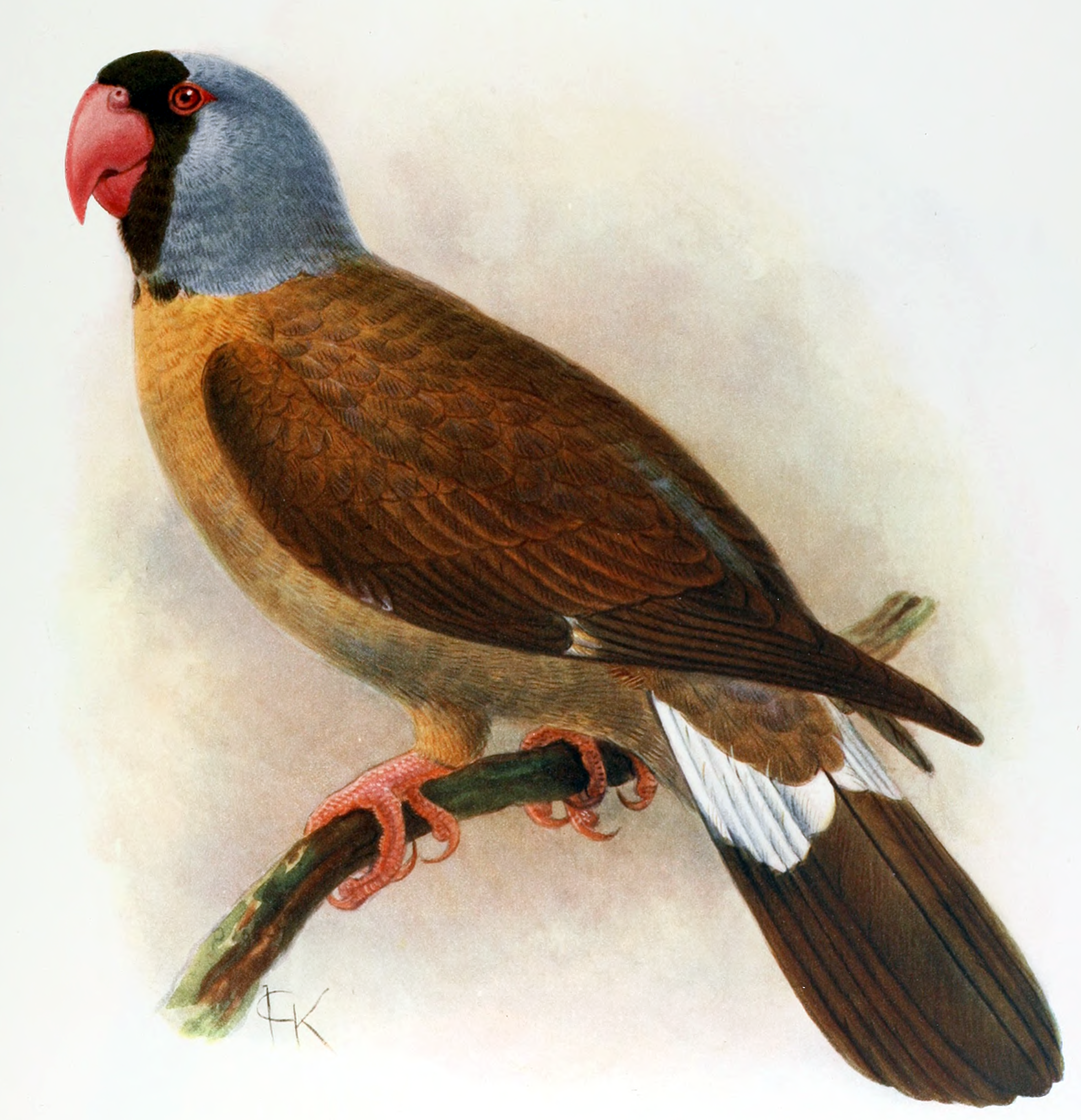
1907 depiction by Keulemans, based on his 1893 illustration

The cladograms below shows the placement of the Mascarene parrot according to the 2011 and 2017 DNA studies:

Kundu and colleagues, 2011:

- E
  - - Coracopsis vasa drouhardii (West Madagascar)
    - Coracopsis vasa vasa (East Madagascar)
  - - Coracopsis nigra barklyi (Praslin Island)
    - - Mascarinus mascarinus (Réunion)
      - - Coracopsis nigra siblans (Comoros)
        - - Coracopsis nigra nigra (East Madagascar)
          - Coracopsis nigra libs (West Madagascar)

Podsiadlowski and colleagues, 2017:

- - Mascarinus mascarinus
  - - Psittacula wardi (Seychelles, extinct)
    - - Psittacula eupatria nipalensis (Central Asia)
      - - Psittacula eupatria magnirostris (Andaman Islands)
        - Psittacula eupatria siamensis (Southeast Asia)

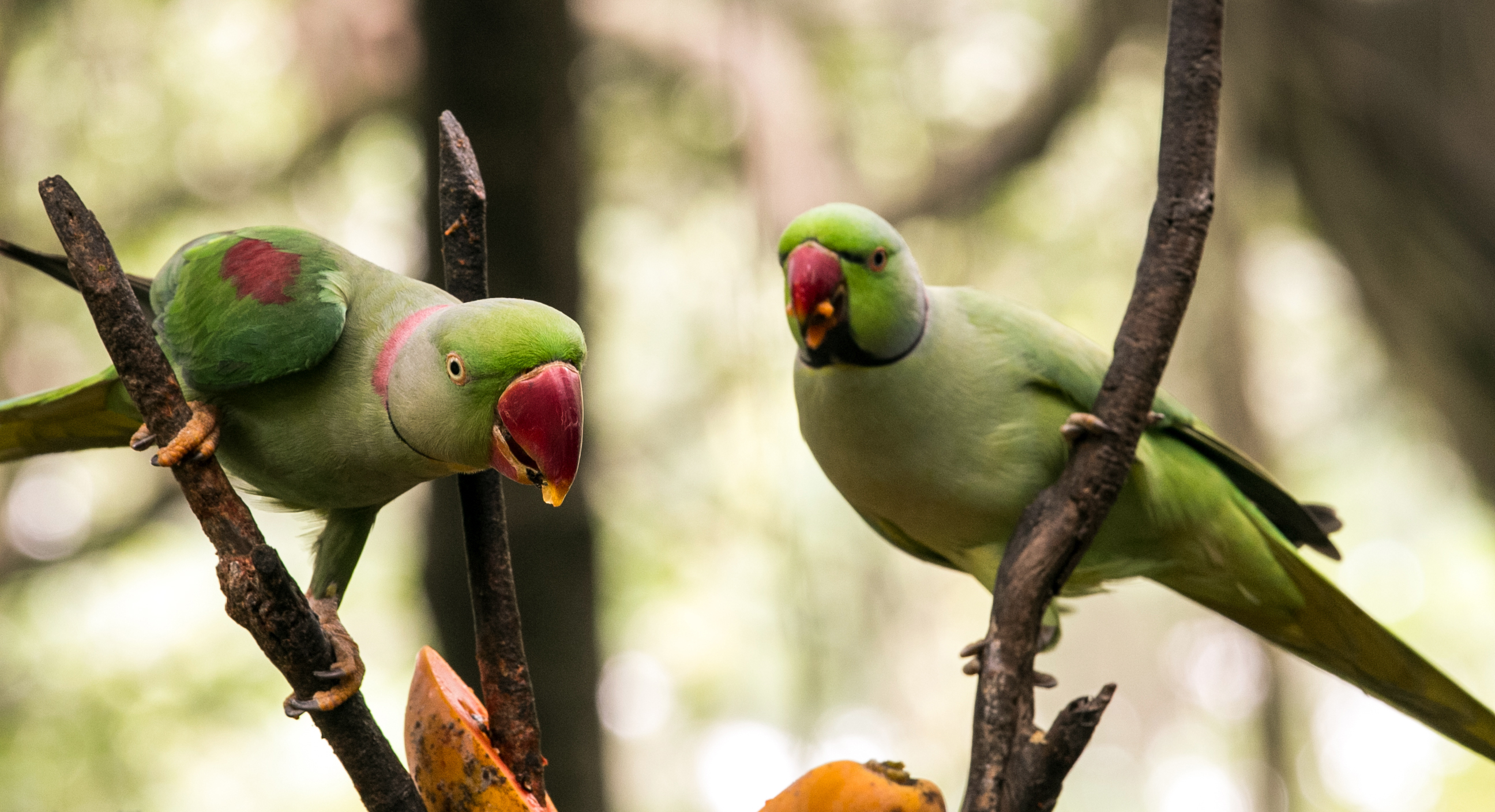
Two male Alexandrine parakeets. This species is the closest living relative according to genetic studies

In 2018, the American ornithologist Kaiya L. Provost and colleagues also found the Mascarene parrot (using the sequence of Podsiadlowski and colleagues) and Tanygnathus species to group within Psittacula, and stated this argued for breaking up the latter genus. To solve the issue that the genera Mascarinus, Tanygnathus, as well as Psittinus fell within the genus Psittacula according to genetic studies, making that genus paraphyletic (an unnatural grouping), the German ornithologist Michael P. Braun and colleagues proposed in 2019 that Psittacula should be split into multiple genera, thereby retaining Mascarinus.

A 2022 genetic study by the Brazilian ornithologist Alexandre P. Selvatti and colleagues confirmed the earlier studies in regard to the relationship between Psittacula, the Mascarene parrot, and Tanygnathus. They suggested that Psittaculinae originated in the Australo–Pacific region (then part of the supercontinent Gondwana), and that the ancestral population of the Psittacula–Mascarinus lineage were the first psittaculines in Africa by the late Miocene (8–5 million years ago), and colonised the Mascarenes from there. In 2024, the American ornithologist Brian Tilston Smith and colleagues noted that if the phylogenetic findings of Podsiadlowski and colleagues were confirmed, the Mascarene parrot would also have to be placed in the genus Palaeornis (which was named before Mascarinus) that was revived by Braun and colleagues in 2019 for the Alexandrine parakeet and related species.

== Description ==
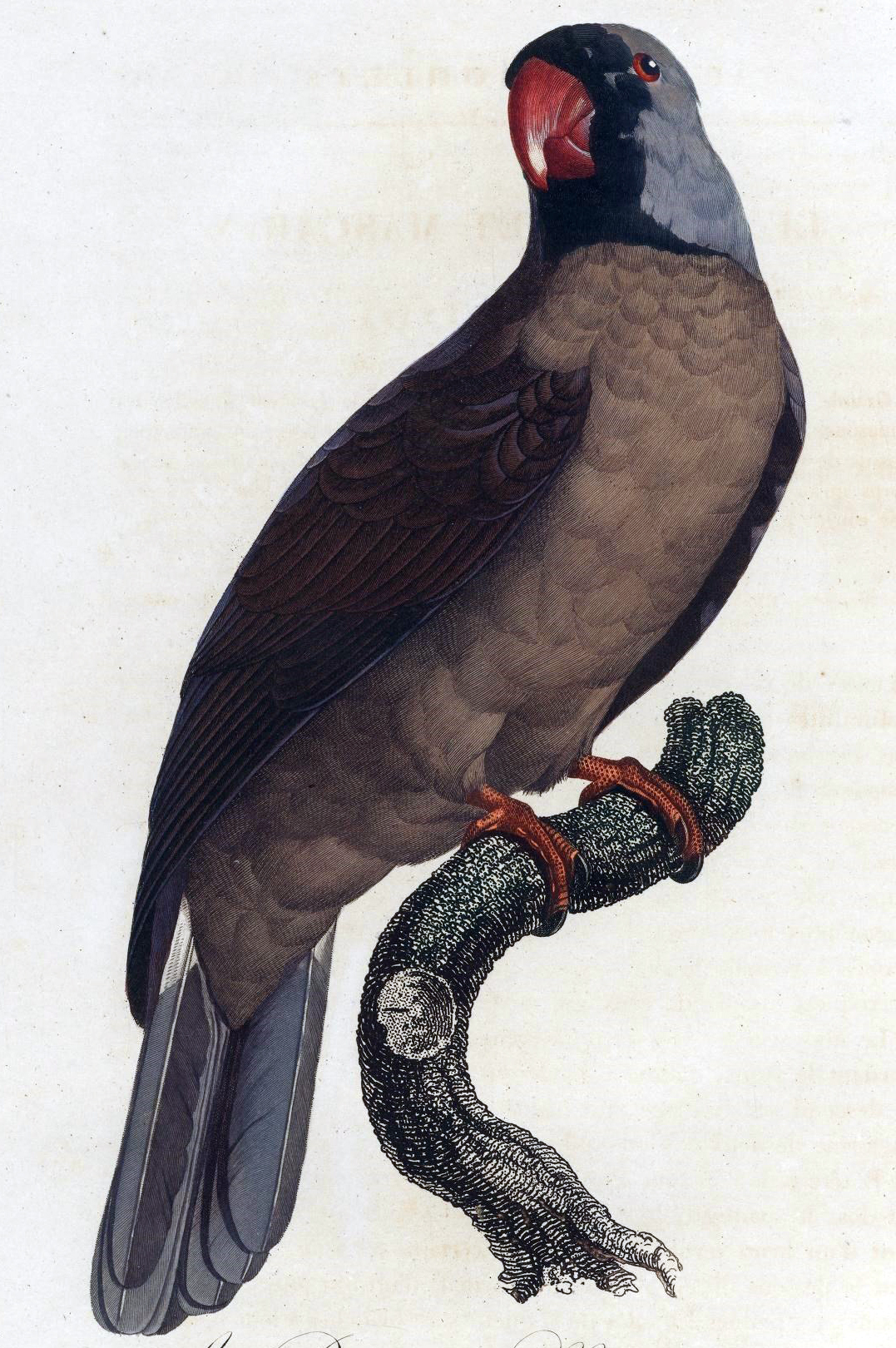
1801 illustration by Jacques Barraband

The Mascarene parrot was 35 cm (14 in) in length. The wing was 211 mm (8.3 in), the tail 144–152 mm (5.7–6.0 in), the culmen 32–36 mm (1.3–1.4 in), and the tarsus 22–24 mm (0.87–0.94 in). It had a large red bill and moderately long, rounded tail feathers. It had a black velvet-like facial mask on the front part of the head. There are several discrepancies in how the colour of the body, wings, tail feathers and the head have historically been described and depicted. In 1674, Dubois described live specimens as being "petit-gris" which is the colour of the dark phase of the red squirrel. According to Hume, this colour is a dark blackish grey or brown.

In 1760, Brisson published the following description based on a captive bird (which may have been the specimen now preserved in Paris):

Upperparts of head and neck clear (ash) grey. Back, rump, underparts of neck, breast, belly, sides, legs, scapular feathers, upper coverts of tail very-dark (ash) grey. Wing feathers of the same colour. The tail is composed of 12 feathers: the two median ones are also very-dark (ash) grey. All the lateral ones are of the same colour, except that they have a little white at their base. The eyes are surrounded by a naked skin, bright red. Pupil black, iris red. The base of the superior half of the beak is also surrounded by a red naked skin in which the nostrils are placed. Beak similarly red. Legs pale flesh. Claws grey-brown. I am unaware from which country it is found. I have seen it living in Paris.

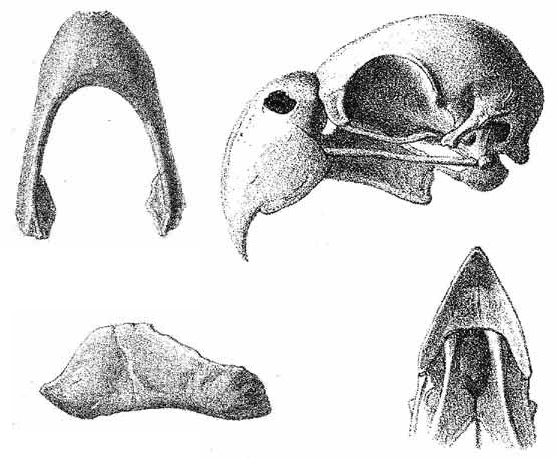
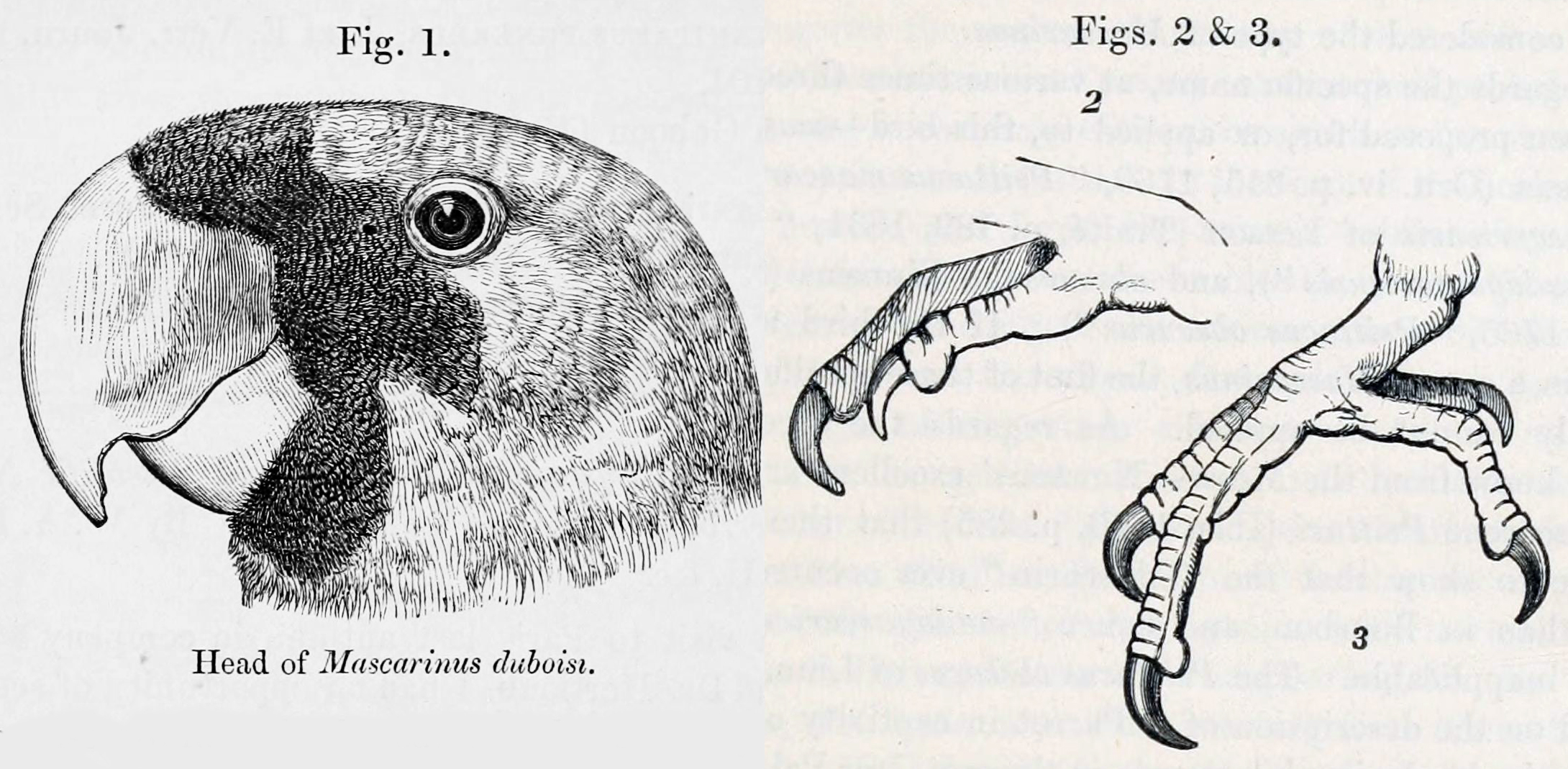
Skull elements extracted from the Paris specimen, 1866 (left), and illustration of the Paris specimen's head after its skull was removed and feet, 1879

The skull of the Mascarene parrot was moderately flattened from top to bottom, the diameter of the nares (bony nostril) was larger than the width of the internal septum (the wall between the nostrils), and there was an indistinct notch on the upper edge of the rostrum (bony beak). The mandibular fenestra (opening at the side of the mandible) was absent, and the back end of the mandibular symphysis (where the two halves of the lower jaw connected) was broadly oval, the angulus mandibulae (the lower margin at the back of the mandible) was flattened instead of angled, and the symphysis was sharply angled downward.

In 1879, Forbes stated the cere was covered by feathers which concealed the nostrils. This contradicts other accounts that mention that the nostrils were surrounded by red skin. Forbes based his description on the Paris specimen which had its skull and mandible removed for study by the French zoologist Alphonse Milne-Edwards prior to 1866. This may have led to the distortion of the shape of the head and nostrils as indicated by the illustration in Forbes' article.

=== Uncertainty about colouration ===
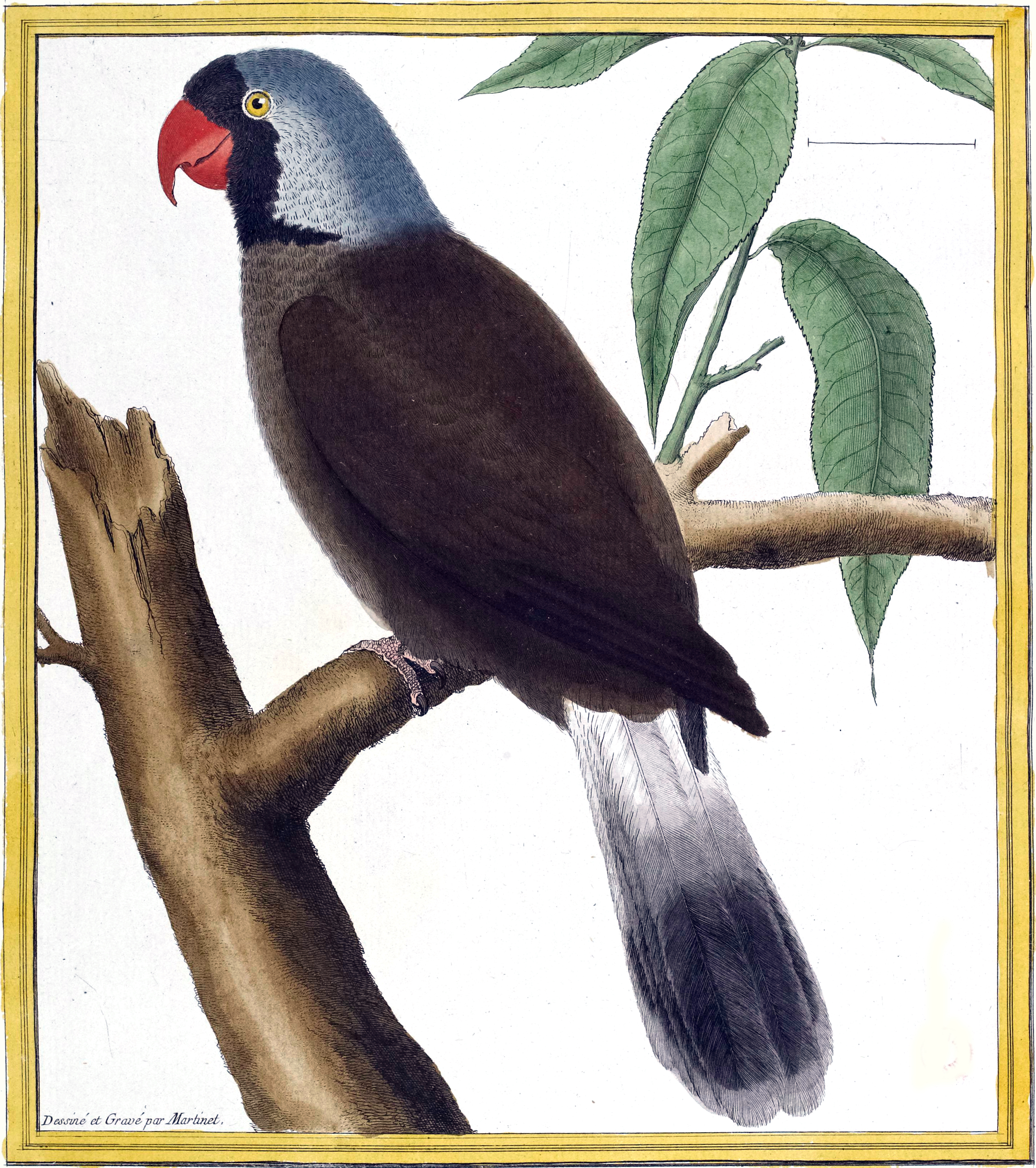
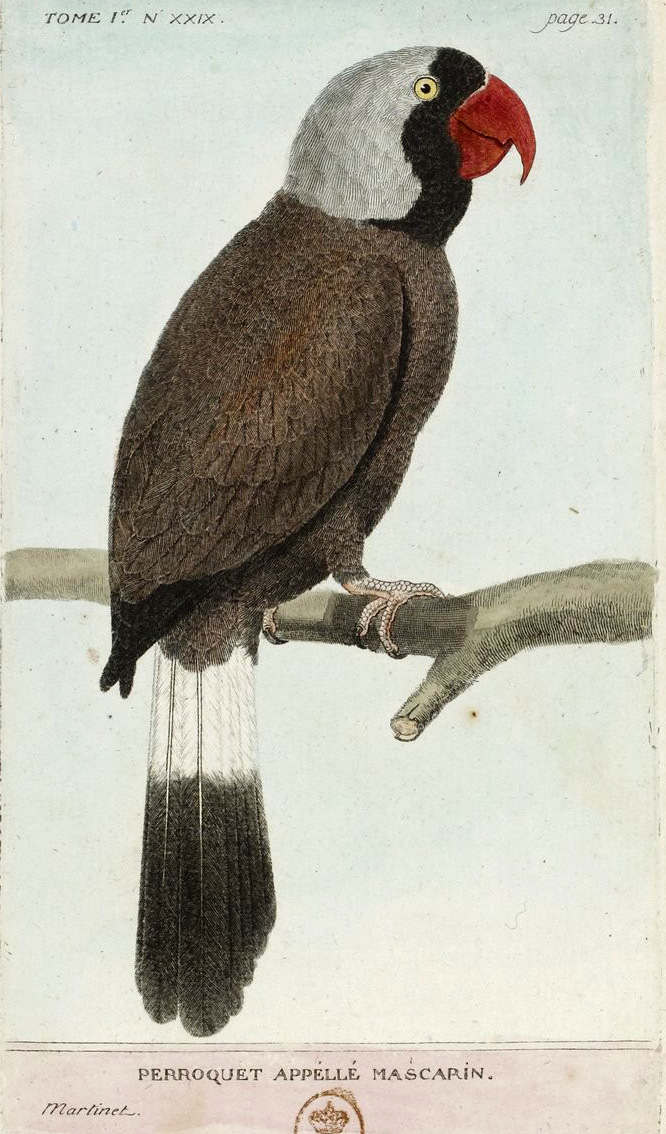
1779 plate by François-Nicolas Martinet, showing a bluish head and brown body (left), and 1790 plate by Martinet, differing in colour details

Instead of grey, several later authors described the body as brown and the head as bluish lilac, based on stuffed specimens, and this has become the "orthodox image" of the bird. Live birds were never described with these colours. Hume proposed that this colouration is an artifact of the taxidermy specimens having aged and being exposed to light, which can turn grey and black to brown. Such a transformation has also turned an aberrant dickcissel (Spiza americana) specimen (sometimes considered a distinct species, "Townsend's dickcissel"), from grey to brown. The two extant Mascarene parrot specimens also differ from each other in colouration. The Paris specimen has a greyish-blue head and a brown body, paler on the underparts. Its tail and wing feathers were severely damaged by sulphuric acid in an attempt at fumigation in the 1790s. The Vienna specimen is a pale brown on the head and body overall, with an irregular distribution of white feathers on the tail, back, and wings. In 2017 the Australian ornithologist Joseph M. Forshaw found it hard to accept that all the illustrations that showed the colour as brown were wrong; he found it more likely that the brown would have merely faded in intensity rather than from grey to brown. He stated that by the time the earliest known illustrations of the bird were made, it is unlikely they would already have faded to brown because of exposure to light. He also doubted that poor diet of caged birds would have consistently turned them brown, and instead accepted the "orthodox image" of the bird as brown.

Confusion over the colouration of the Mascarene parrot has also been furthered by a plate by French engraver François-Nicolas Martinet in Buffon's 1779 Histoire Naturelle Des Oiseaux, the first coloured illustration of this species. It shows the bird as brown with a purplish head, and the strength of these colours differs considerably between copies, a result of having been hand-coloured by many different artists who worked under Martinet in his workshop. Across these copies, the body ranges from chestnut brown to greyish chocolate, the tail from light grey to blackish grey-brown, and the head from bluish grey to dove-grey. The plate also lacks two dark central tail feathers without white bases, a feature described by Brisson, and these features have been repeated by subsequent artists. Martinet's illustration and Buffon's description were perhaps based on the Paris specimen.

== Behaviour and ecology ==
Very little is known about the Mascarene parrot in life. Since several specimens were kept alive in captivity, it was probably not a specialised feeder. That the Vienna specimen was partially white may have been the result of food deficiency during a long period in captivity; the clipped primary wing feathers indicate it was caged. Little was known about parrot-diet in the 1700s, and the Vienna specimen may not have received enough of the amino acid tyrosine through its food, which it would have needed for melanin synthesis. In other parrots, this would have resulted in orange instead of white colour in the affected feathers, due to the presence of the pigment psittacin, but Coracopsis parrots and the Mascarene parrot are the only parrots that lack this pigment. The specimen has also been described as "partially albinistic" at times, though true albinism (lack of the enzyme tyrosinase) can by definition never only be partial.

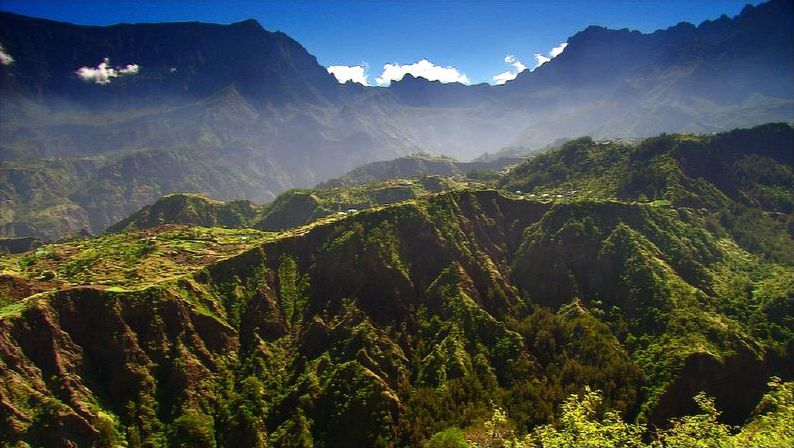
Mountain area on Réunion

In 1705, the French cartographer Jean Feuilley gave a description of the parrots of Réunion and their ecology which indicates that they fattened themselves seasonally:

There are several sorts of parrot, of different sizes and colours. Some are the size of a hen, grey, the beak red [Mascarene parrot]; others the same colour the size of a pigeon [Mascarene grey parakeet], and yet others, smaller, are green [Réunion parakeet]. There are great quantities, especially in the Sainte-Suzanne area and on the mountainsides. They are very good to eat, especially when they are fat which is from the month of June until the month of September because at that time the trees produce a certain wild seed that these birds eat.

The Mascarene parrot may have once inhabited Mauritius as well based on a 17th-century account by the English traveller Peter Mundy which mentioned "russet parrots". This is a possibility, since Réunion and Mauritius do share some types of animals, but no fossil evidence has yet been discovered.

Many other endemic species of Réunion became extinct after the arrival of humans and the resulting disruption of the island's ecosystem. The Mascarene parrot lived alongside other recently extinct birds such as the hoopoe starling, the Réunion ibis, the Réunion parakeet, the Mascarene grey parakeet, the Réunion swamphen, the Réunion scops owl, the Réunion night heron, and the Réunion pink pigeon. Extinct Réunion reptiles include the Réunion giant tortoise and an undescribed Leiolopisma skink. The small Mauritian flying fox and the snail Tropidophora carinata lived on Réunion and Mauritius but vanished from both islands.

== Extinction ==
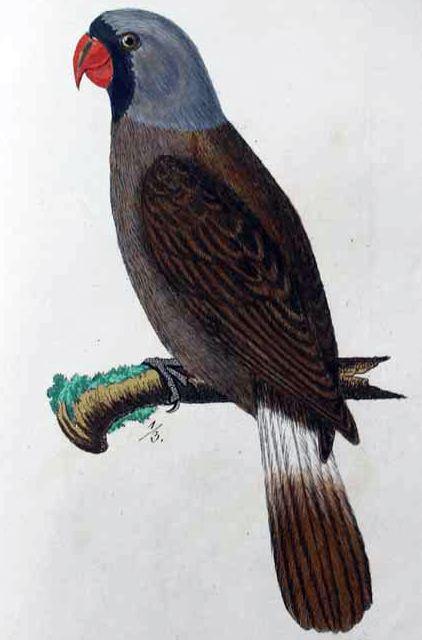
Carl Wilhelm Hahn's 1834 illustration of the supposedly last living bird, which may have been based on Martinet's 1779 image

Of the eight or so parrot species endemic to the Mascarenes, only the echo parakeet (Psittacula echo) of Mauritius has survived. The others probably all became extinct due to a combination of excessive hunting and deforestation. The cause and date of extinction for the Mascarene parrot itself is uncertain. In 1834, the German zoologist Carl Wilhelm Hahn published an often-cited account of a live Mascarene parrot in the possession of King Maximilian I Joseph of Bavaria. The bird must have been very old at the time, and Hahn claimed an accompanying illustration was drawn after this specimen. The IUCN Red List accepts the 1834 account as the last mention of a live specimen.

The veracity of Hahn's claim was questioned as early as 1876, and the illustration appears to be plagiarised from the plate by François-Nicolas Martinet which was published at least 50 years earlier. After King Maximilian died in 1825, his collection was auctioned off, but no Mascarene parrot was mentioned in the inventory of species. Hahn did not mention the date in which he actually saw the bird which could have been long before 1834. The fact that Martinet's image was copied and that no mounted specimen exists (though such a rare bird would probably have been preserved) makes Hahn's account dubious. He may instead have based his account on other sources or even hearsay.

If Hahn's account is disregarded, the Mascarene parrot probably became extinct prior to 1800. The last account of wild specimens on Réunion is from the 1770s. It is thought that the Mascarene parrot went extinct in the wild while captive specimens still survived in Europe, since specimens are known to have lived there after the last mention of wild birds. In the 1790s, French naturalist François Levaillant stated that the bird was rare and that he had seen three of them in France.

One of the last definite accounts of live specimens is the following 1784 description by Mauduyt based on captive birds:

The Mascarin is found at Ile Bourbon [Réunion]; I have seen several alive in Paris, they were rather gentle birds; they had in their favour only that the red beak contrasted agreeably with the dark background of their plumage; they had not learnt to talk.

Contrary to Feuilley's claims, Dubois mentioned that the Mascarene parrot was not edible which may have led to Réunion visitors mostly ignoring it. It was the last of the indigenous parrots of Réunion to become extinct. The only endemic bird species on Réunion that disappeared after the Mascarene parrot was the hoopoe starling in the mid-19th century.

== Cited texts ==
- Cheke, A. S.; Hume, J. P. (2008). Lost Land of the Dodo: an Ecological History of Mauritius, Réunion & Rodrigues. New Haven and London: T. & A. D. Poyser. ISBN 978-0-7136-6544-4.
