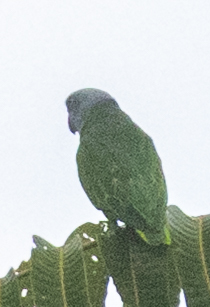

Conservation status
- Near Threatened (IUCN 3.1)

Scientific classification
- Kingdom: Animalia
- Phylum: Chordata
- Class: Aves
- Order: Psittaciformes
- Family: Psittaculidae
- Genus: Psittinus
- Species: P. abbotti

Binomial name
- Psittinus abbotti Richmond, 1902

= Simeulue parrot =

Species of bird

The Simeulue parrot (Psittinus abbotti) is a parrot endemic to two small islands off Sumatra. It is a former subspecies of the blue-rumped parrot (Psittinus cyanurus) and split by the HBW/BirdLife checklist, with the IOC later following suit, supporting its status as a distinct species.

== Description ==
The Simeulue parrot is a small, short-tailed bird of stocky build, measuring approximately 19 cm (7.5 in). It has a bright green colouration, which in adult males is accented by a blue face with a green crown and a black collar. It differs from the blue-rumped parrot in its larger size, the lack of grey mantle and back, lack of blue rump, green instead of brown head colouration in the female, and blue head colouration in the male.

== Distribution and conservation status ==
This taxon is restricted to Simeulue and Siumat islands off north-west Sumatra. Estimates of total population size are uncertain, ranging from 5,000 up to 47,000 birds. While there is no current indication of population decline, the Simeulue parrot has been classified as near threatened by the IUCN due to its limited distribution and likely present and future loss of habitat to mining and agriculture. It is the only Indonesian parrot species not protected by Indonesian law.
