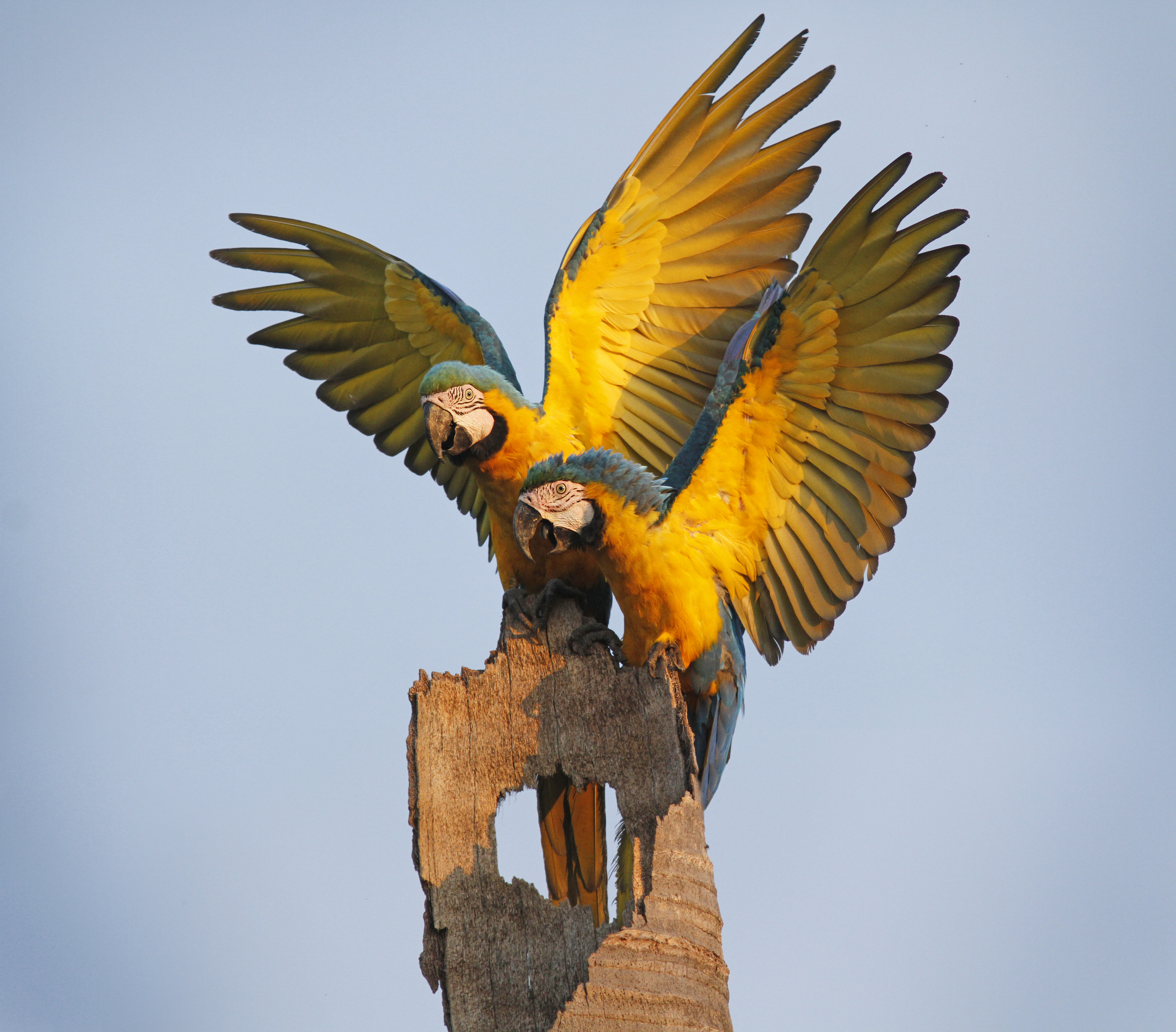
- Blue-and-yellow macaws at Campo Grande, Brazil

Scientific classification
- Kingdom: Animalia
- Phylum: Chordata
- Class: Aves
- Order: Psittaciformes
- Superfamily: Psittacoidea; Illiger, 1811

Families
- Psittacidae; Psittaculidae; Psittrichasiidae

= True parrot =

True parrots

Superfamily of birds

The true parrots are about 350 species of hook-billed, mostly herbivorous birds forming the superfamily Psittacoidea, one of the three superfamilies in the biological order Psittaciformes (parrots). (Note: The other superfamilies are the Cacatuoidea (cockatoos) and New Zealand Strigopoidea which are also parrots, but not classified as true parrots.) True parrots are widespread, with species in Mexico, Central and South America, sub-Saharan Africa, India, Southeast Asia, Australia, and eastwards across the Pacific Ocean as far as Polynesia. The true parrots include many of the familiar parrots, including macaws, conures, lorikeets, eclectus parrots, Amazon parrots, the grey parrot, and the budgerigar. Most true parrots are colourful and flighted, with a few notable exceptions. (Note: Four species are ground-dwelling: three in genus Pezoporus and the Antipodes parakeet.)

== Overview ==
True parrots have a beak with a characteristic curved shape, the jaw with a mobility slightly higher than where it connects with the skull, and a generally upright position. They also have a large cranial capacity and are one of the most intelligent bird groups. They are good fliers and skilful climbers on branches of trees.

Some species can imitate the human voice and other sounds, although they do not have vocal cords, instead possessing a vocal organ at the base of the trachea known as the syrinx.

Like most parrots, the Psittacidae are primarily seed eaters. Some variation is seen in the diet of individual species, with fruits, nuts, leaves, and even insects and other animal prey being taken on occasion by some species. The lorikeets are predominantly nectar feeders; many other parrots drink nectar, as well. Most Psittacidae are cavity-nesting birds which form monogamous pair bonds.

=== Evolution ===
It is believed that the breakup of the final remnants of Gondwana, when South America drifted away from Antarctica and Australia at the end of the Eocene, kickstarted the separate radiations of psittacids in South America and psittaculids in Australasia.

=== Distribution and habitat ===
The true parrots are distributed throughout the tropical and subtropical regions of the world, mostly in the Southern Hemisphere, covering many different habitats, from the humid tropical forests to deserts in Australia, India, Southeast Asia, sub-Saharan Africa, Central and South America, and two species, one extinct (the Carolina parakeet), formerly in the United States. However, the larger populations are native to Australasia, South America, and Central America.

== Conservation status ==
Many species are classified as threatened by the International Union for Conservation of Nature (see IUCN Red List of birds), as well as national and nongovernmental organizations. Trade in birds and other wild animals is governed by the Convention on International Trade in Endangered Species of Wild Fauna and Flora (CITES). Nearly all parrots are listed on CITES appendices, trade limited or prohibited. Trapping wild parrots for the pet trade, hunting, habitat loss, and competition from invasive species have diminished wild populations, with parrots being subjected to more exploitation than any other group of birds. Of the animals removed from the wild to be sold, very few survive during capture and transport, and those that do often die from poor conditions of captivity, poor diet, and stress. Measures taken to conserve the habitats of some high-profile charismatic species have also protected many of the less charismatic species living in the same ecosystems.

About 18 species of parrots have gone extinct since 1500 (see List of extinct birds#Psittaciformes), nearly all in superfamily Psittacoidea.

== Taxonomy ==
The parrot family Psittacidae (along with the family Cacatuidae comprising the order Psittaciformes) was traditionally considered to contain two subfamilies, the Psittacinae (typical parrots and allies) and the Loriinae (lories and lorikeets). However, the tree of the parrot family now has been reorganized under the superfamily Psittacoidea: family Psittacidae has been split into three families, tribes Strigopini and Nestorini split out and placed under superfamily Strigopoidea and a new monotypic superfamily Cacatuoidea created containing family Cacatuidae.

The following classification is based on the most recent proposal, which in turn is based on all the relevant recent findings.

Family Psittacidae, New World and African parrots

- Subfamily Psittacinae: Two African genera, Psittacus and Poicephalus
- Subfamily Arinae
  - Tribe Arini: 17 genera, and one extinct genus
  - Tribe Androglossini: seven genera
  - clade (proposed tribe Amoropsittacini) four genera
  - clade (proposed tribe Forpini) one genus
  - (other tribes) five genera

Family Psittrichasiidae, Indian Ocean island parrots

- Subfamily Psittrichasinae: one species, Pesquet's parrot
- Subfamily Coracopsinae: one genus with several species

Family Psittaculidae, Asian and Australasian parrots, and lovebirds

- Subfamily Platycercinae
  - Tribe Pezoporini: ground parrots and allies
  - Tribe Platycercini: broad-tailed parrots
- Subfamily Psittacellinae: one genus (Psittacella) with several species
- Subfamily Loriinae
  - Tribe Loriini: lories and lorikeets
  - Tribe Melopsittacini: one species, the budgerigar
  - Tribe Cyclopsittini: fig parrots
- Subfamily Agapornithinae: three genera
- Subfamily Psittaculinae
  - Tribe Polytelini: three genera
  - Tribe Psittaculini: Asian psittacines
  - Tribe Micropsittini: pygmy parrots

== Species lists ==
- Species list sortable alphabetically by common or scientific name
- Species list in taxonomic order
