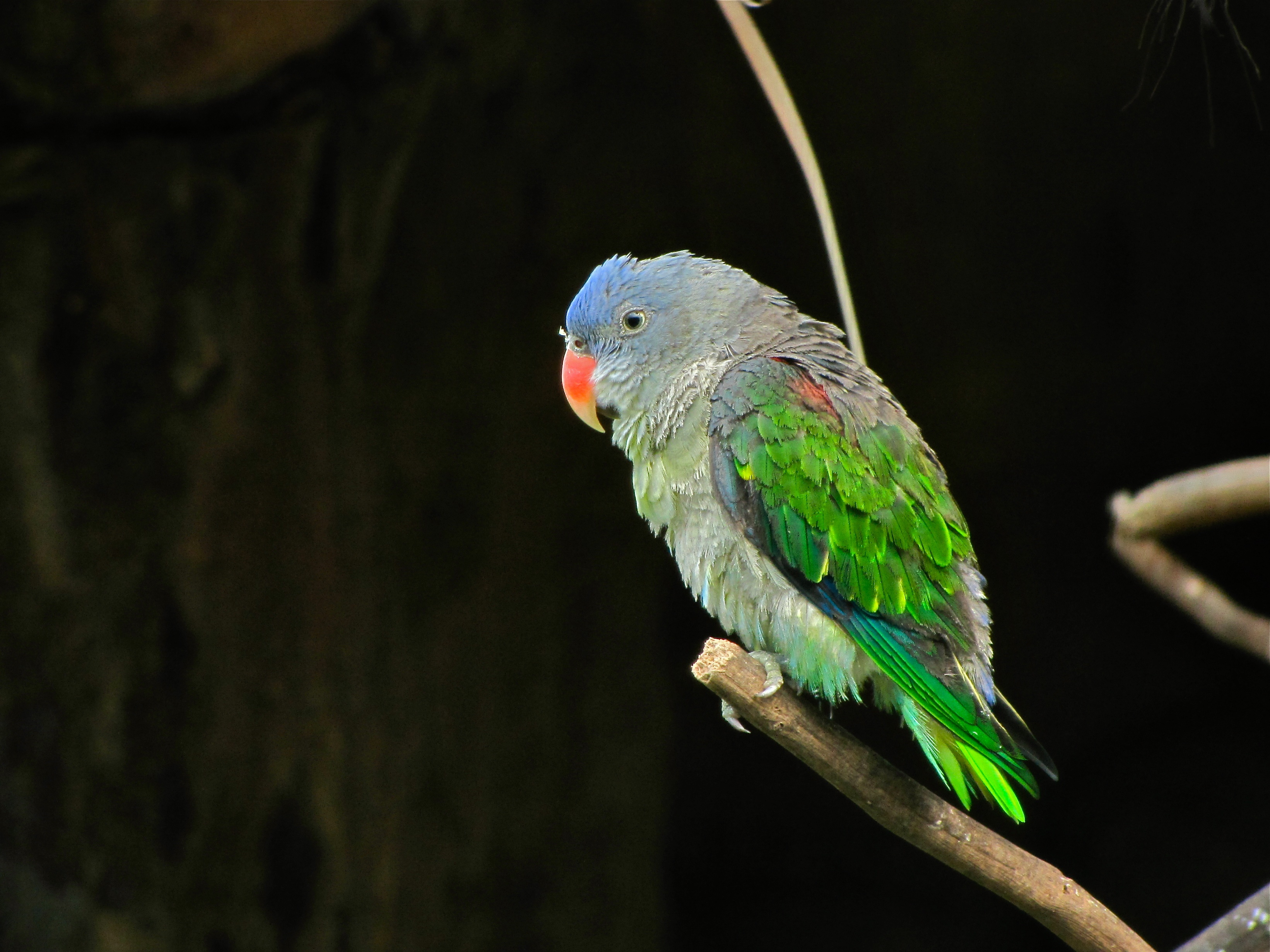

Conservation status
- Near Threatened (IUCN 3.1)

Scientific classification
- Kingdom: Animalia
- Phylum: Chordata
- Class: Aves
- Order: Psittaciformes
- Family: Psittaculidae
- Genus: Psittinus
- Species: P. cyanurus

Binomial name
- Psittinus cyanurus (Forster, JR, 1795)

= Blue-rumped parrot =

Species of bird

The blue-rumped parrot (Psittinus cyanurus) is a parrot found in the very southern tip of Myanmar, peninsular Thailand, Malaysia, Borneo, Sumatra and nearby islands. It is a small parrot (18 cm) and is primarily green with bright red underwing coverts, a reddish shoulder patch, and yellowish margins on the wing coverts. It is sexually dimorphic. The female has a grey-brown head. The male has a black mantle, red upper mandible, and blue head and rump.

It was formerly considered the only member of the genus Psittinus, but BirdLife International recognised the subspecies abbottii as a separate species, the Simeulue parrot, and the IOC later followed suit, supporting it as a distinct species.

There are two subspecies:

- P. c. cyanurus: Malay peninsula, Sumatra and Borneo.
- P. c. pontius: Mentawai Islands southwards from Siberut. Larger than the nominate subspecies.

It is found in lowland forests, generally below 700 m, in forest, open woodland, orchards and plantations, mangroves, dense scrub, and coconut groves. It occurs in flocks up to 20 birds. They eat seeds, fruit and blossoms.
