= Archaeopsittacus =

Archaeopsittacus Temporal range: Late Oligocene/Early Miocene

Scientific classification
- Kingdom: Animalia
- Phylum: Chordata
- Class: Aves
- Order: Psittaciformes
- Superfamily: Psittacoidea
- Genus: †Archaeopsittacus; Lambrecht, 1933
- Species: †A. verreauxi

Binomial name
- †Archaeopsittacus verreauxi (A. Milne-Edwards, 1870)

Synonyms
- Psittacus verreauxii (lapsus) A. Milne-Edwards, 1870

Extinct genus of birds

Archaeopsittacus is a genus of prehistoric parrot. It is known from deposits of either Late Oligocene or Early Miocene age (c. 23 mya) at Verreaux near Saint-Gérand-le-Puy, France. A single species, Archaeopsittacus verreauxi, is known.

The genus was apparently close to the Old World lineages of parrots and might conceivably be assigned to the modern superfamily Psittacoidea. Its lack of apomorphies prevents any better placement until more material is found.
