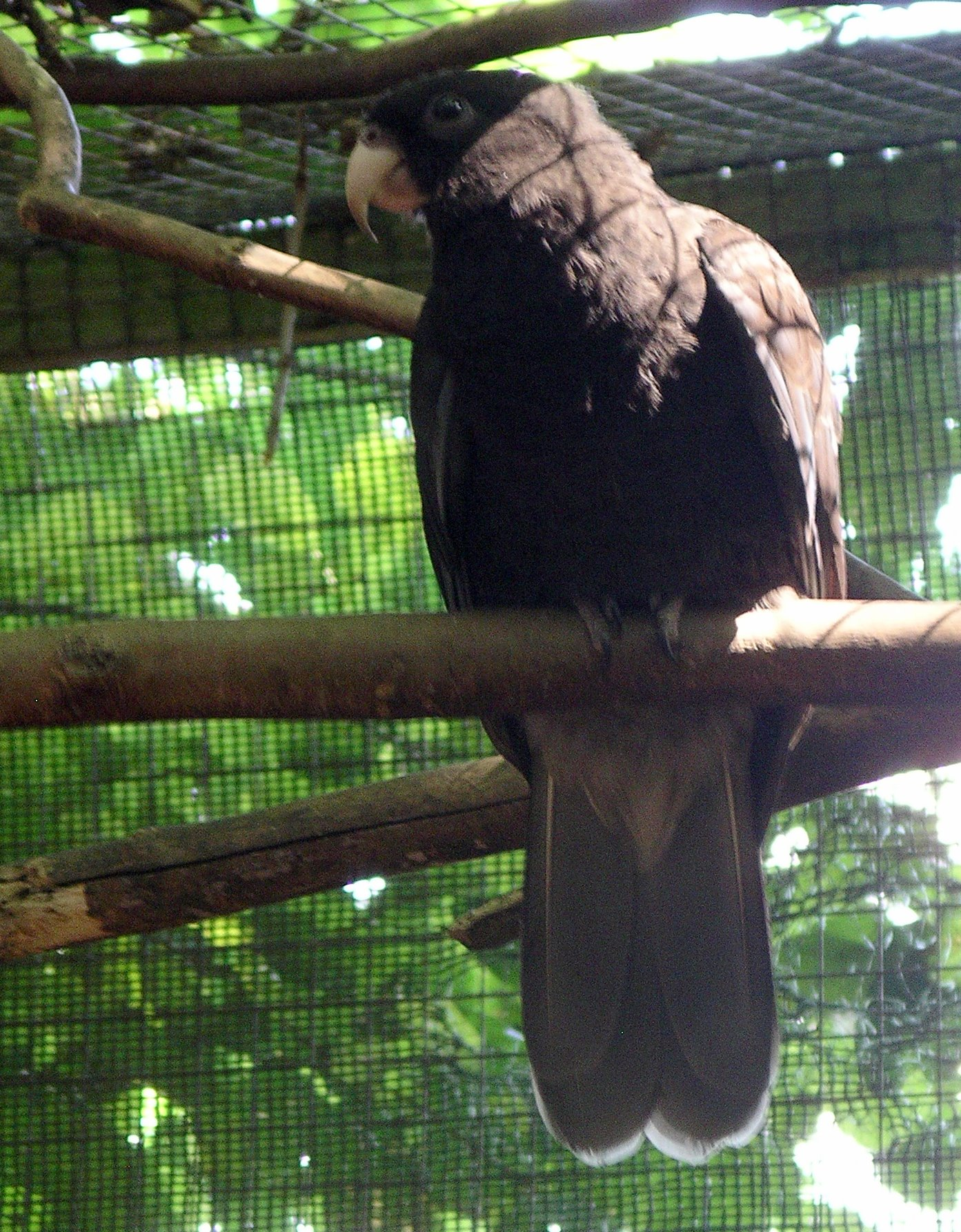
- Lesser vasa parrot

Scientific classification
- Kingdom: Animalia
- Phylum: Chordata
- Class: Aves
- Order: Psittaciformes
- Family: Psittaculidae
- Subfamily: Psittrichasinae
- Genus: Coracopsis; Wagler, 1832

Type species
- Psittacus niger (lesser vasa parrot) Linnaeus, 1758

Species
- Coracopsis vasa; Coracopsis nigra; Coracopsis sibilans; Coracopsis barklyi

= Vasa parrot =

Genus of birds

The name vasa parrot is also used for the greater vasa parrot.

The vasa parrots that form the genus Coracopsis are four species of parrot in the parrot family Psittrichasiidae that are endemic to Madagascar and other islands in the western Indian Ocean. Some taxonomists formerly placed the species in the genus in Mascarinus, but this is now thought to be based on the results of a heavily flawed, later-debunked genetic study.

== Taxonomy ==
The genus Coracopsis was introduced in 1832 by the German ornithologist Johann Georg Wagler. The type species was designated as the lesser vasa parrot by George Robert Gray in 1840.

=== Species ===
The genus contains four species:

Genus Coracopsis – Linnaeus, 1758 – four species
Common name	Scientific name and subspecies	Range	Size and ecology	IUCN status and estimated population
Greater vasa parrot	Coracopsis vasa (Shaw, 1812) Three subspecies: Coracopsis vasa comorensis, (Peters, W, 1854); Coracopsis vasa drouhardi, Lavauden, 1929; Coracopsis vasa vasa, (Shaw, 1812)	Madagascar and the Comoros.	Size: Habitat: Diet:	LC
Lesser vasa parrot or Black parrot	Coracopsis nigra (Linnaeus, 1758) Two subspecies: Coracopsis nigra libs, Bangs, 1927; Coracopsis nigra nigra, (Linnaeus, 1758)	Madagascar	Size: Habitat: Diet:	LC
Comoros black parrot	Coracopsis sibilans (Milne-Edwards & Oustalet, 1885)	the Comoros	Size: Habitat: Diet:	NT
Seychelles black parrot	Coracopsis barklyi Newton, 1867	the Seychelles	Size: Habitat: Diet:	VU

=== Phylogeny ===
A 2011 genetic study found the Mascarene parrot from Réunion to be nested among the subspecies of the lesser vasa parrot from Madagascar and nearby islands, and therefore not related to the Psittacula parrots. It also found that the Mascarene parrot line diverged 4.6 to 9 million years ago, prior to the formation of Réunion, indicating this must have happened elsewhere. The cladogram accompanying the study is shown below:

- E
  - - Coracopsis vasa drouhardii (W Madagascar)
    - Coracopsis vasa vasa (E Madagascar)
  - - Coracopsis nigra barklyi (Praslin Island (Seychelles))
    - - Mascarinus mascarinus (Reunion (Mascarenes))
      - - Coracopsis nigra siblans (Comoros)
        - - Coracopsis nigra nigra (E Madagascar)
          - Coracopsis nigra libs (W Madagascar)

Another group of scientists later acknowledged the finding, but pointed out that the sample might have been damaged, and that further testing was needed before the issue could be fully resolved. They also noted that if Mascarinus was confirmed to be embedded within the genus Coracopsis, the latter would become a junior synonym, since the former name is older. Hume has expressed surprise by these findings, due to the anatomical similarities between the Mascarene parrot and other parrots from the islands that are believed to be psittaculines. However, a later study found that the placement of Mascarinus within Coracopsis was likely a result of cross-contamination of genetic material during the study, debunking this placement, and supporting them as being two distinct, unrelated genera within different subfamilies.

== Description ==
They are notable in the parrot world for their peculiar appearance, which includes extremely truncated bodies with long necks, black to grey feathers and a pink beak.

The skin of both female and male vasas turns yellow during the breeding season, and there is often feather loss. However, in females the feather loss can result in complete baldness. Another interesting feature of the females breeding physiology is when her feathers, which are usually black to grey, turn brown without a moult. This is caused by the redistribution of melanin, which is the pigment that makes the vasas' feathers black.

== Unusual characteristics ==
In addition to their appearance they possess aspects of their physiology that make them unique amongst parrots. Vasa chicks are known to hatch after only 18–20 days of incubation, which is highly irregular as parrots of the vasa size range tend to take up to 30 days to hatch.

The male vasas' cloaca is able to evert into a hemipenis, which becomes erect during mating – a feature unique to the genus. This phallus is associated with prolonged matings enforced by a copulatory tie. Baby vasas possess pads on their beaks which when stimulated prompt a strong feeding response. These pads disappear after only a few weeks, however the feeding or 'weaning' reflex remains unusually strong well into adulthood. Often aviculturalists have to use a syringe to force food into the crops of young vasas as the intensity of the weaning reflex prevents them from being spoon fed.

Vasa parrots infected with the debilitating psittacine beak and feather disease are known to turn white, which, during the 1970s when the first wave of birds were exported into Europe and America, resulted in them being mistakenly advertised by importers as albinos.
