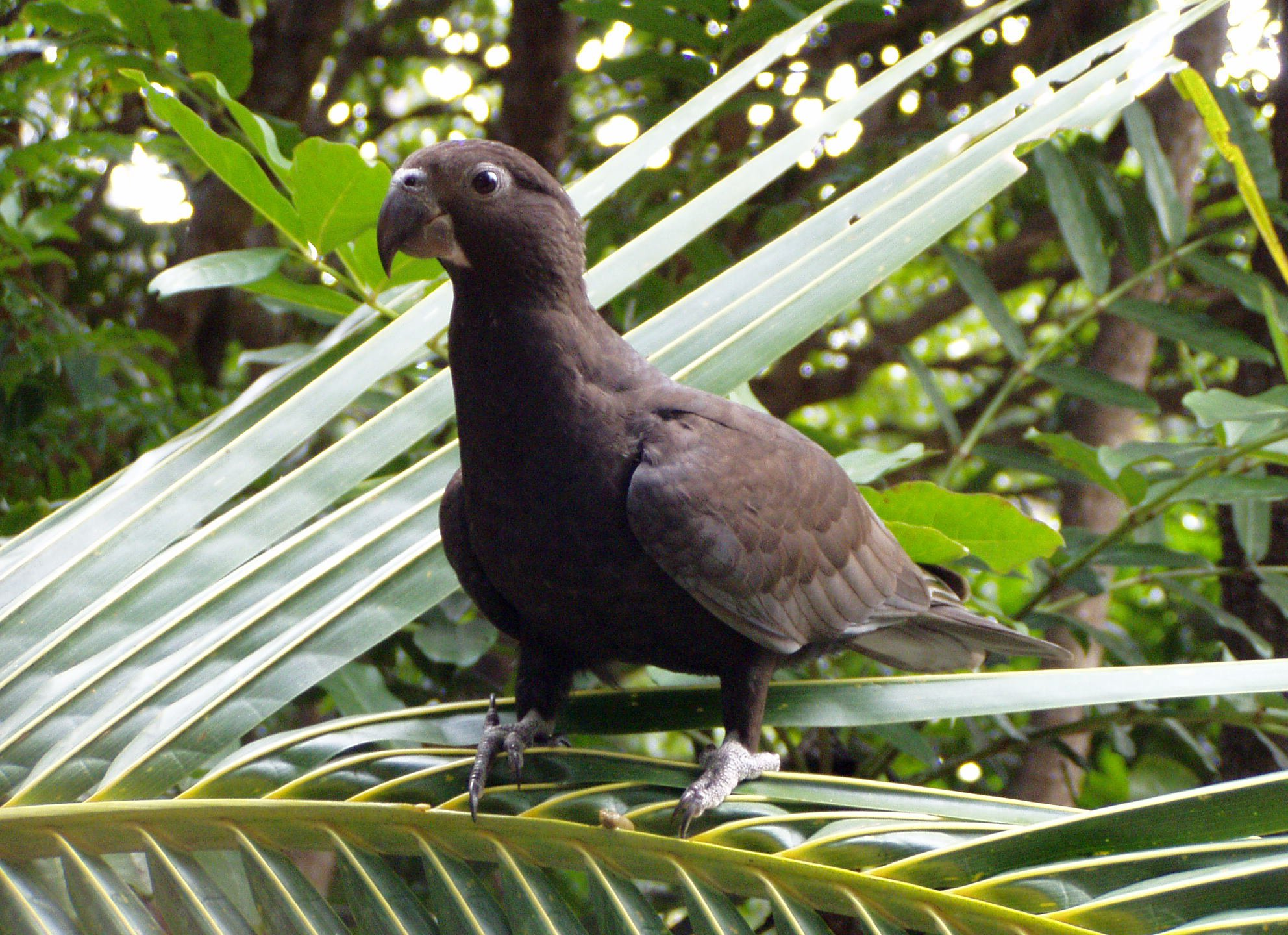
- In Madagascar
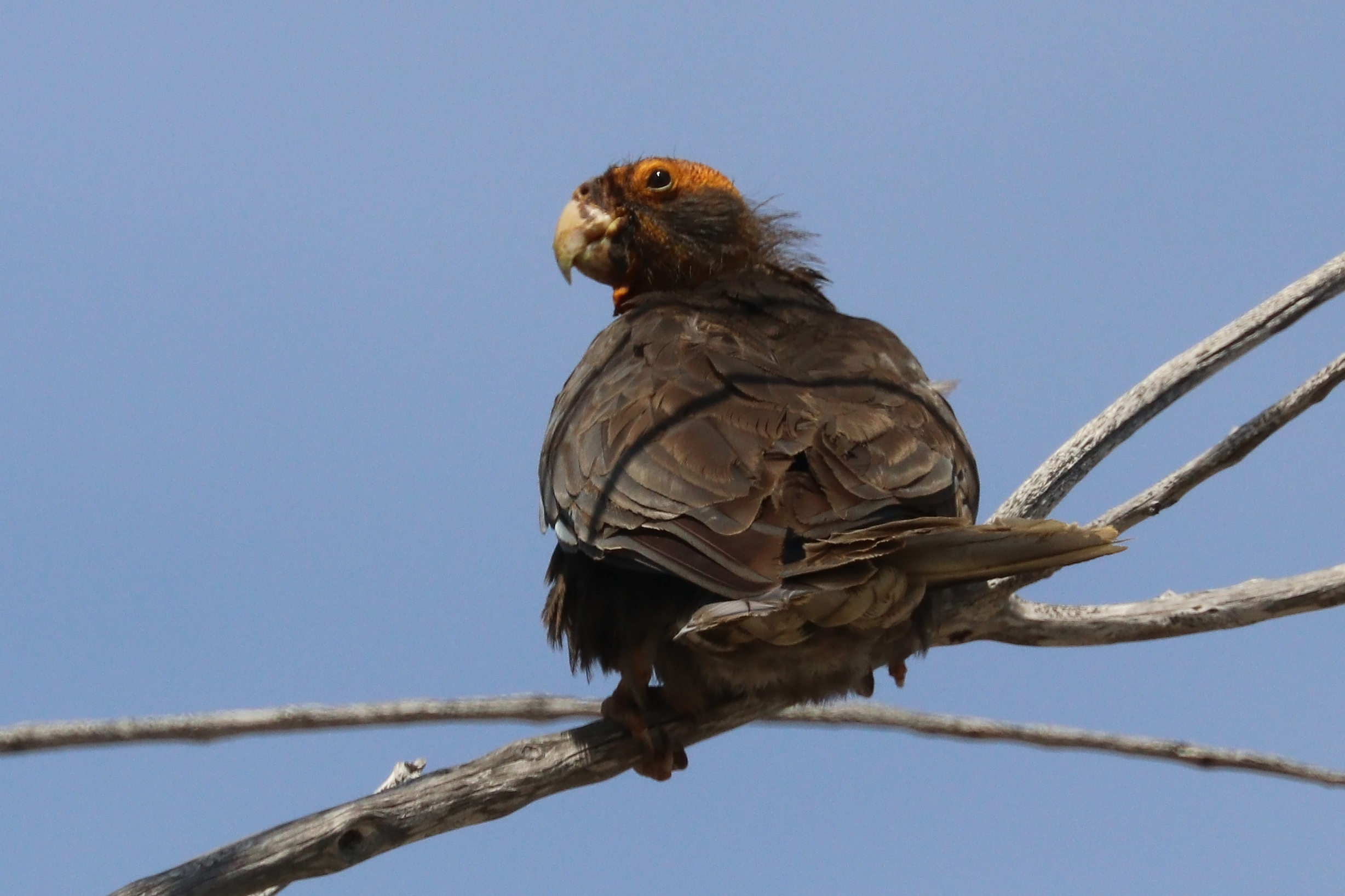
- C. v. drouardi, female in breeding plumage

Conservation status
- Least Concern (IUCN 3.1)

Scientific classification
- Kingdom: Animalia
- Phylum: Chordata
- Class: Aves
- Order: Psittaciformes
- Family: Psittaculidae
- Genus: Coracopsis
- Species: C. vasa

Binomial name
- Coracopsis vasa (Shaw, 1812)

= Greater vasa parrot =

Species of bird

The greater vasa parrot (Coracopsis vasa) is one of two species of vasa parrot, the other being the lesser vasa parrot (C. nigra). The greater vasa parrot can be found throughout Madagascar and the Comoros.

== Taxonomy ==
The bird was first described in 1812 by George Shaw. There are three subspecies:

- C. v. comorensis (Peters, W, 1854)
- C. v. drouhardi Lavauden, 1929
- C. v. vasa (Shaw, 1812)

The bird is placed in the genus Mascarinus by some authorities.

== Description ==
The greater vasa parrot's breeding season is uncertain, but is probably between October and December. It has a very unusual breeding biology and mating system; females are 25% larger than males, and are, physically, dominant. The species lives in loose, polygynandrous groups wherein each female has at least 3-8 sexual partners. The males have re-evolved a phallus, and copulations can last up to 90 minutes. Copulations come in two lengths—short (1–3 seconds) and long durations (averaging 36 minutes), with the latter involving a copulatory tie. A copulatory tie usually applies to mammals, such as canids and felids, where the two animals are unable to physically part during mating due to the swelling, and structure, of the penis within the female's body (being barbed or lined with small "hooks" in some species). During brooding and chick-rearing, females shed their head feathers and develop bright orange skin coloration, and also sing complex songs from perches close to the nest. These serve to attract males to approach and regurgitate food, which the female accepts while off the nest. The females also defend a territory around their nest from other females during this period.

== Ecology ==
In Madagascar it is more common in portions of the dry deciduous forests, compared with the lesser vasa parrot which is more common in the humid forests of the east coast. Feeds, in large, noisy flocks, on wild berries, fruits, nuts and seeds and also on cultivated maize, millet and rice. The bird is active on moonlit nights, otherwise they roost in large noisy flocks in the tops of large trees. A lookout warns of danger.

Greater vasa parrots in Lincolnshire Wildlife Park have been recorded using grinding technology – the first non-human animal to be observed doing this. They were observed holding date stones and pebbles in their beak to grind calicium-rich dust from seashells. It happens most frequently just before the breeding season and the males were observed doing it more often. A possible explanation is the females need the extra calcium to build eggshells and the males feed them with regurgitated food.

== Status ==
This bird is common in some areas and overall the population is thought to be declining, but not enough to classify this bird as vulnerable. The International Union for Conservation of Nature has classified the conservation status of this bird as of least concern.
