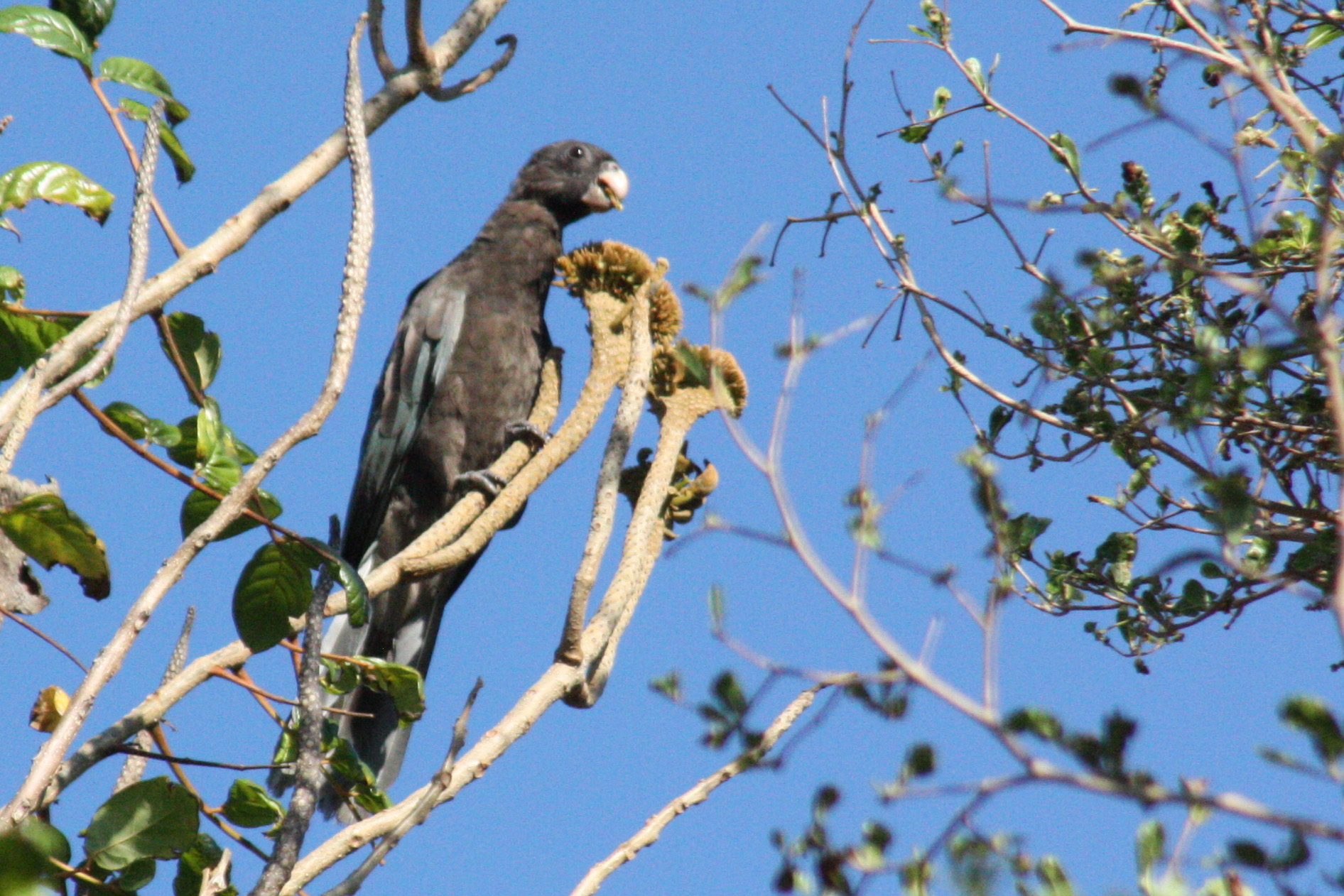
- Coracopsis nigra in Anjajavy Forest, Madagascar

Conservation status
- Least Concern (IUCN 3.1)

Scientific classification
- Kingdom: Animalia
- Phylum: Chordata
- Class: Aves
- Order: Psittaciformes
- Family: Psittaculidae
- Genus: Coracopsis
- Species: C. nigra

Binomial name
- Coracopsis nigra (Linnaeus, 1758)

Synonyms
- Psittacus niger Linnaeus, 1758

= Lesser vasa parrot =

Species of bird

The lesser vasa parrot or black parrot (Coracopsis nigra) is a black coloured parrot endemic to most of Madagascar. It is one of four species of vasa parrots, the others being the greater vasa parrot (C. vasa), the Seychelles black parrot (C. barklyi), and the Comoros black parrot (C. sibilans). The latter two were formerly considered conspecific with the lesser vasa parrot.

Lesser vasa parrots inhabit the mangrove swamps and evergreen forests of Madagascar. They eat seeds, blossoms and fruit - especially berries and mangos.

They build their nests in tree hollows and go through courtship in February. During this time, the female may shed the feathers on her head giving it a yellowish tone. The male's beak may also turn white during this time.

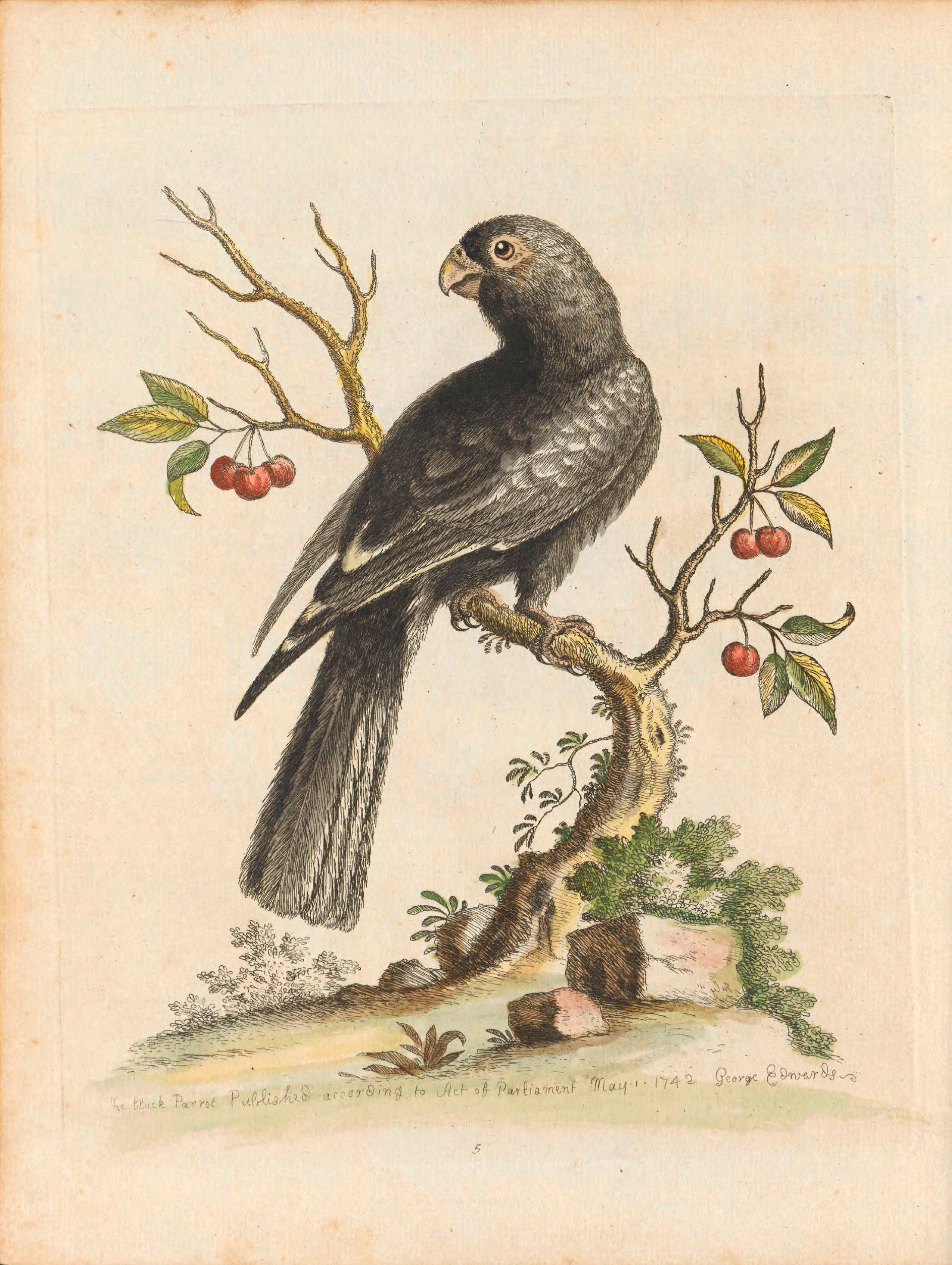
Hand coloured etching by George Edwards published in 1743

Feeding at the National Aviary, Pittsburgh, Pennsylvania

== Taxonomy ==
In 1743, the English naturalist George Edwards included a picture and a description of the lesser vasa parrot in his A Natural History of Uncommon Birds. He used the English name "Black Parrot from Madagascar". His drawing was made from a live bird owned by the Duke of Richmond. When in 1758 the Swedish naturalist Carl Linnaeus updated his Systema Naturae for the tenth edition, he placed the lesser vasa parrot with all the other parrots in the genus Psittacus. Linnaeus included a brief description, coined the binomial name Psittacus niger and cited Edwards's work. The specific epithet niger is Latin meaning "black". The lesser vasa parrot is now placed in the genus Coracopsis that was introduced in 1832 by the German ornithologist Johann Georg Wagler.

Two subspecies are recognised:

- C. n. libs Bangs 1927 – west, south Madagascar
- C. n. nigra (Linnaeus, 1758) – east Madagascar

The Seychelles black parrot (C. barklyi) and Comoros black parrot (C. sibilans) were formerly considered subspecies, but were later split as distinct species.

A 2011 genetic study found the Mascarene parrot from Réunion to be nested among the subspecies of the lesser vasa parrot from Madagascar and nearby islands, and therefore not related to the Psittacula parrots. It also found that the Mascarene parrot line diverged 4.6 to 9 million years ago, prior to the formation of Réunion, indicating this must have happened elsewhere. The cladogram accompanying the study is shown below:

- - - Coracopsis vasa drouhardii – west Madagascar
    - Coracopsis vasa vasa – east Madagascar
  - - Coragopsis nigra barklyi – Praslin (Seychelles)
    - - Mascarinus mascarinus – Réunion (Mascarene Islands)
      - - Coracopsis nigra siblans – Comoros
        - - Coracopsis nigra nigra – east Madagascar
          - Coracopsis nigra libs – west Madagascar

Another group of scientists later acknowledged the finding, but pointed out that the sample might have been damaged, and that further testing was needed before the issue could be fully resolved. They also noted that if Mascarinus was confirmed to be embedded within the genus Coracopsis, the latter would become a junior synonym, since the former name is older. Hume has expressed surprise by these findings, due to the anatomical similarities between the Mascarene parrot and other parrots from the islands that are believed to be psittaculines. However, a later study found that the placement of Mascarinus within Coracopsis was likely a result of cross-contamination of genetic material from the lesser vasa parrot during the study, debunking this placement, and supporting them as being two distinct, unrelated genera within different subfamilies.
