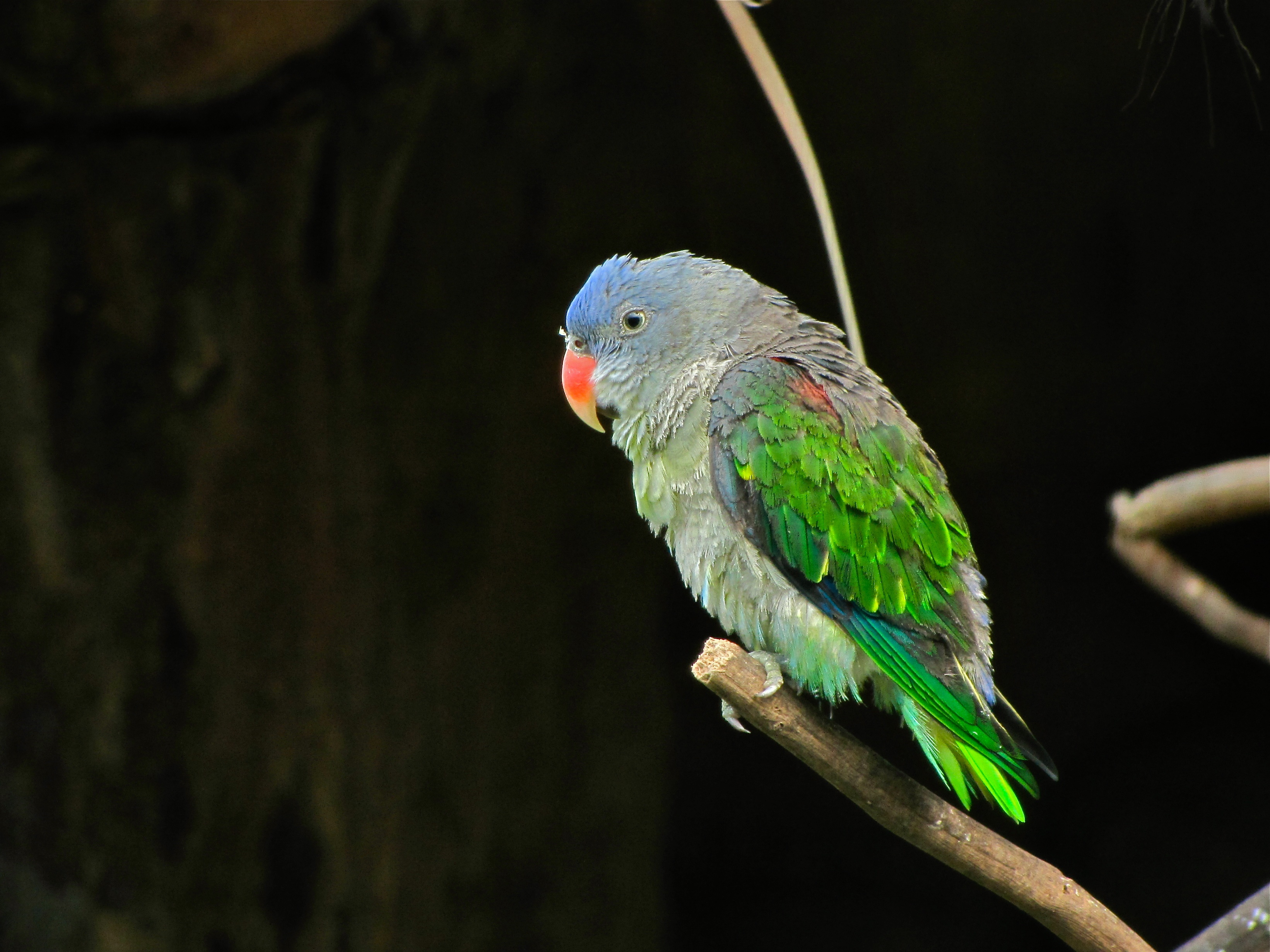
- Blue-rumped parrot

Scientific classification
- Kingdom: Animalia
- Phylum: Chordata
- Class: Aves
- Order: Psittaciformes
- Family: Psittaculidae
- Tribe: Psittaculini
- Genus: Psittinus; Blyth, 1842

Type species
- Psittacus malaccensis Latham, 1790

Species
- Psittinus cyanurus Psittinus abbotti

= Psittinus =

Genus of birds

Psittinus is a genus of parrot in the family Psittaculidae. It was formerly considered to include a single species, the blue-rumped parrot (Psittinus cyanurus), but the Simeulue parrot (P. abbotti) was split as a distinct species by the IOC in 2021. A 2019 genetic analysis found that the genus Psittacula is paraphyletic with respect to Psittinus, indicating that Psittacula may have to be split into different genera in order to maintain Psittinus as a distinct genus.
