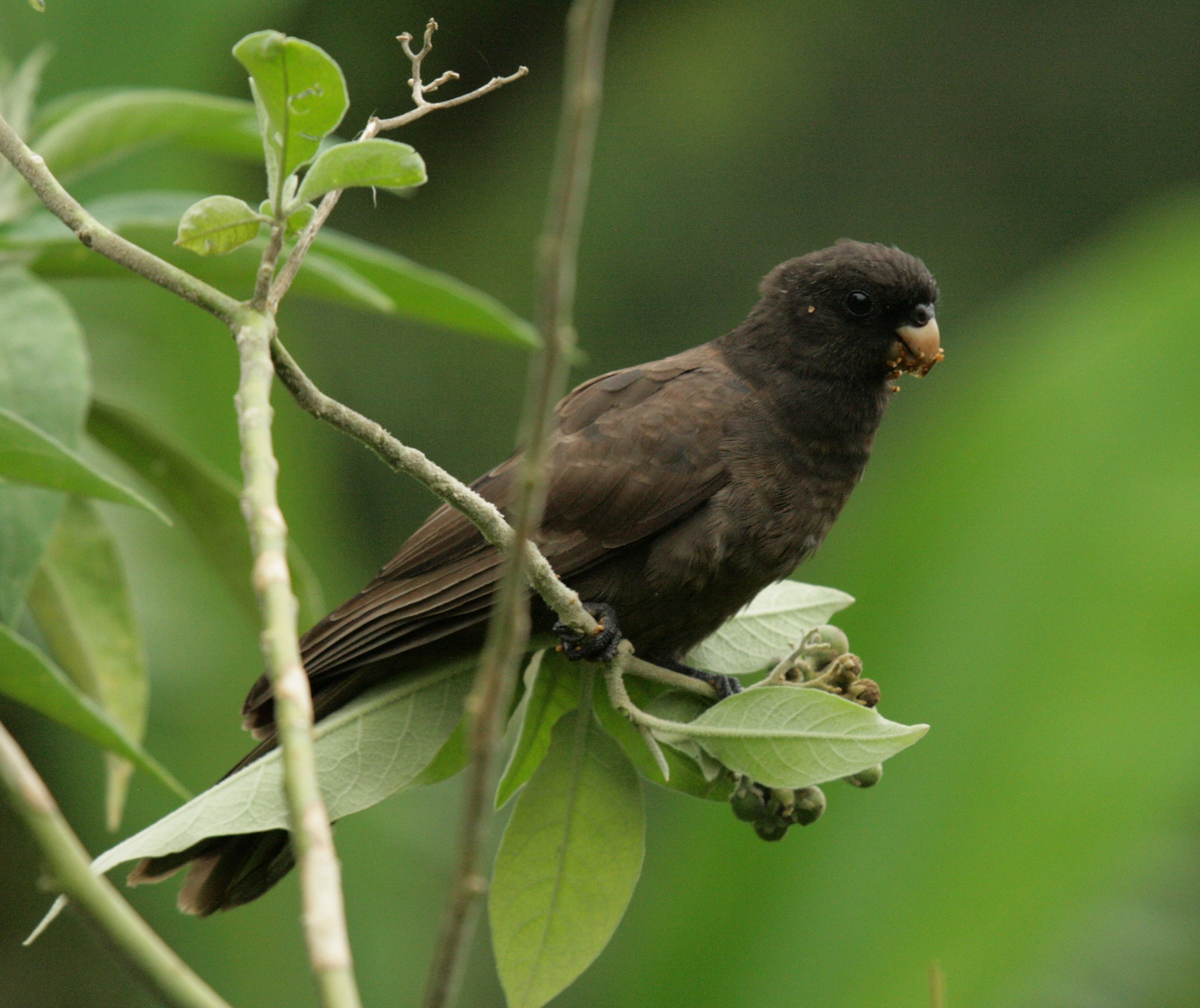

Conservation status
- Near Threatened (IUCN 3.1)

Scientific classification
- Kingdom: Animalia
- Phylum: Chordata
- Class: Aves
- Order: Psittaciformes
- Family: Psittaculidae
- Genus: Coracopsis
- Species: C. sibilans

Binomial name
- Coracopsis sibilans Milne-Edwards & Oustalet, 1885

= Comoro black parrot =

Species of bird

The Comoros black parrot (Coracopsis sibilans) is a medium-sized parrot endemic to the Comoros. Historically, it has been treated as a subspecies of the lesser vasa parrot, although it shows morphological, ecological and behavioural differences. It was split as a distinct species by the IOC in 2021.
