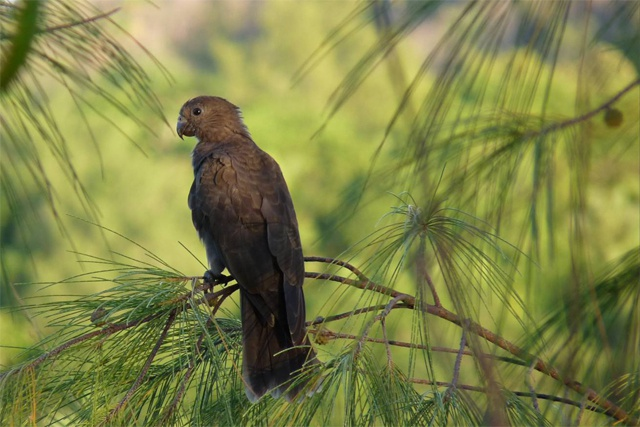

Conservation status
- Vulnerable (IUCN 3.1)

Scientific classification
- Kingdom: Animalia
- Phylum: Chordata
- Class: Aves
- Order: Psittaciformes
- Family: Psittaculidae
- Genus: Coracopsis
- Species: C. barklyi

Binomial name
- Coracopsis barklyi Newton, E, 1867

= Seychelles black parrot =

Species of bird

The Seychelles black parrot, Praslin parrot or kato nwar (Coracopsis barklyi) is a sombre-coloured, medium-sized parrot endemic to the Seychelles. Historically, it has been treated as a subspecies of the lesser vasa parrot, although it shows morphological, ecological and behavioural differences. Recent phylogenetic research indicates that the Seychelles population has a long history of isolation and may be sister to the rest of Coracopsis. It is the national bird of the Seychelles.

== Description ==
The Seychelles black parrot is entirely dark grey-brown except for greyish undertail-coverts; the dark bill becomes paler during the breeding season. It is about 30 cm in length, smaller and paler than the 35 cm lesser vasa parrot.

== Distribution and habitat ==
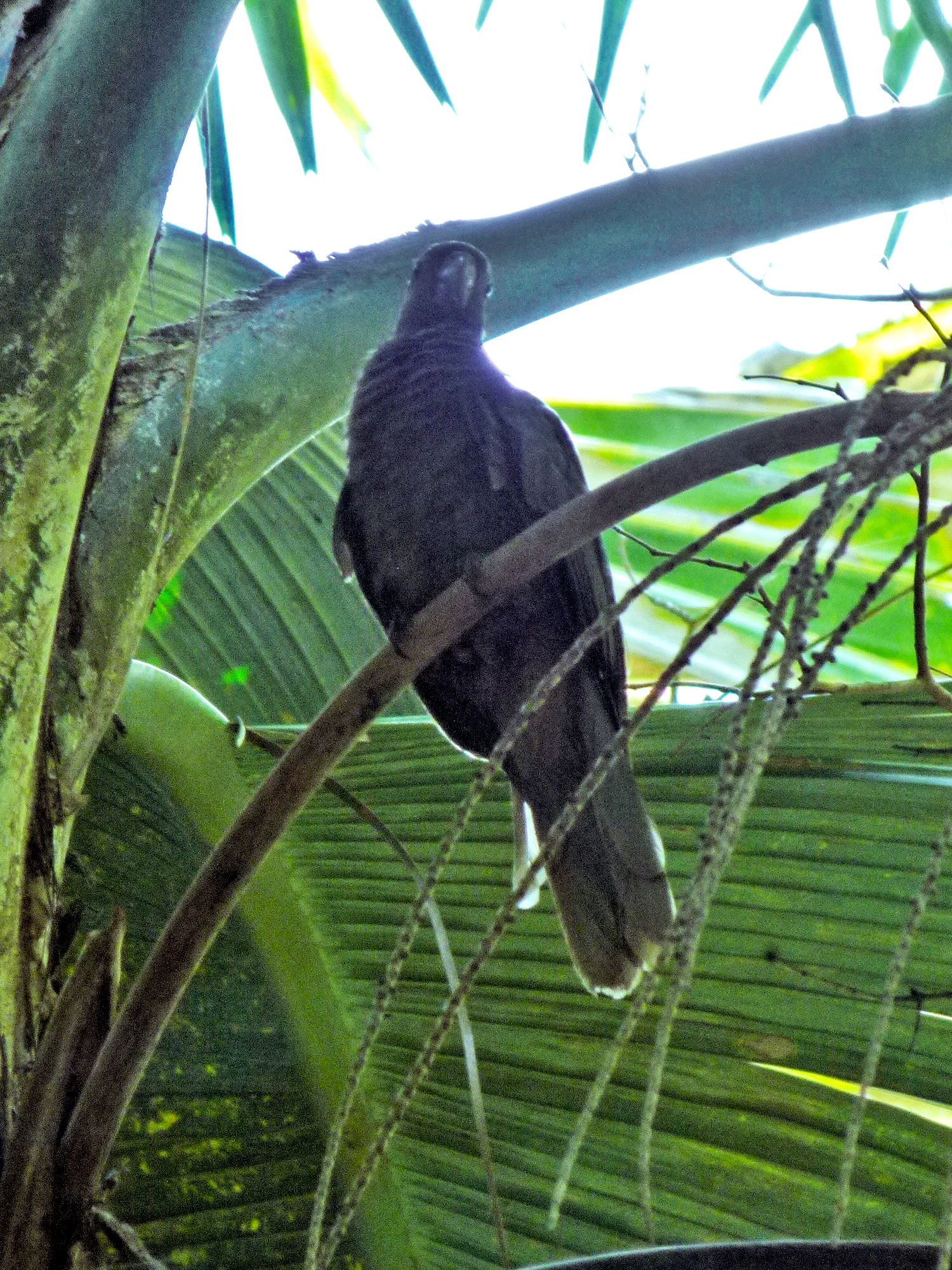
Observation of the black parrot in Vallée De Mai (Praslin, March 2016)

The parrot is found only on the island of Praslin, where its main breeding area is limited by the availability of mature palm forest to the Vallée de Mai Nature Reserve and the lower part of Fond Peper in Praslin National Park. It has also been recorded (since 1988) on neighbouring Curieuse where it has been seen feeding though there is no evidence of breeding. It inhabits woodland, scrubland and gardens.

== Behaviour ==
=== Feeding ===
The parrots' diet is principally fruit, both wild and cultivated, as well as flowers and buds. Wild foods include the fruits of the endemic palm Vershaffeltia splendida, growing along the river valleys, as well as the flowers of the coco de mer. Cultivated fruits utilised by the parrots include guava, papaya, mango and bilimbi.

=== Breeding ===
The birds breed in deep cavities of old tree trunks with good cover, where they lay 1-3 eggs.

== Status and conservation ==
The population of the Seychelles black parrot is around 520-900 birds. Although it is protected, it is threatened by illegal persecution outside the reserve as well as by competition for nesting hollows with common mynas, and predation by introduced rats.
