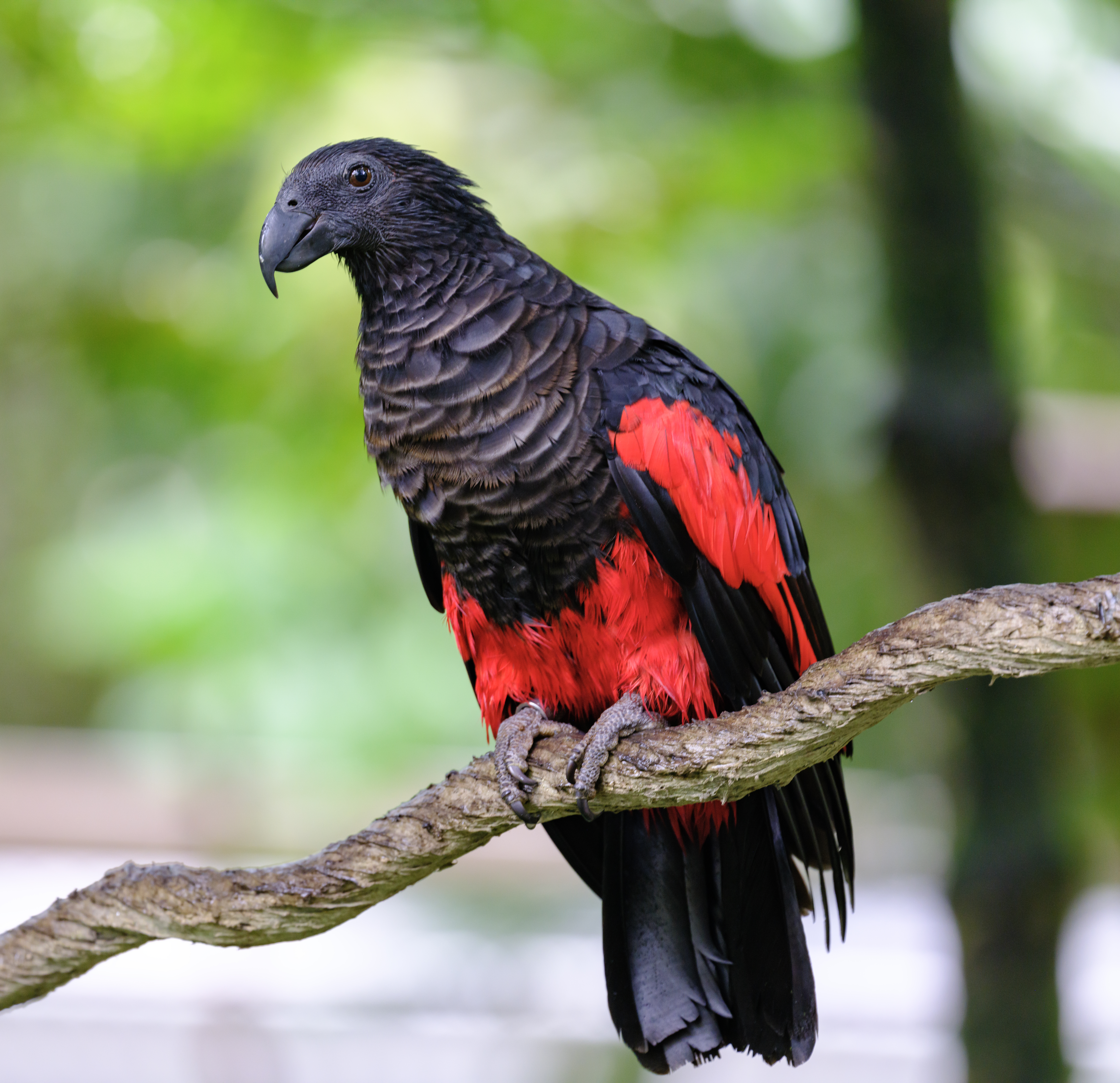
- Pesquet's parrot at Bird Paradise, Singapore

Conservation status
- Vulnerable (IUCN 3.1)

Scientific classification
- Kingdom: Animalia
- Phylum: Chordata
- Class: Aves
- Order: Psittaciformes
- Family: Psittaculidae
- Subfamily: Psittrichasinae
- Genus: Psittrichas; Lesson, 1831
- Species: P. fulgidus

Binomial name
- Psittrichas fulgidus (Lesson, 1830)

= Pesquet's parrot =

Species of bird

Pesquet's parrot (Psittrichas fulgidus), also known as vulturine parrot (though this usually refers to the South American species Pyrilia vulturina) or bare-headed parrot, is a member of the Old World parrot family Psittaculidae. It is the only member of the genus Psittrichas. The species is endemic to hill and montane rainforests in New Guinea.

== Naming ==
Lesson first named the species Banksianus fulgidus (1830), but he had also uses the names Psittacus pecquetii (1831), Psittacus pesquetii (1831), and Psittrichas pesqueti (1838). Meanwhile Selby (1836) used the name Dasyptilus pequeti. Salvadori (1879) gives a list of no fewer than twelve synonyms, which Gould (1888) copied when he illustrated the bird under the name Dasyptilus pesqueti.

One story is that Pesquet's parrot was named after a M. Pecquet, who gave the holotype specimen to Lesson along with the information that it had come from Patagonia; Lesson later noted that the bird had likely come instead from New Guinea (its true habitat). The bird was obtained by Pecquet during a circumnavigation aboard the French vessel L'Astrolabe, a voyage on which Lesson's brother Pierre-Adolphe was present. The first name of M. Pecquet remains mysterious, as does even the correct spelling of his name: Pequet, Peçquet, Pescquiet, etc.

However, Watkins (2004) claims that more likely no "M. Pecquet" existed; Lesson received the parrot specimen directly from his brother, and (after first naming it B. fulgidus) rechristened it D. pecquetii in honour of the French anatomist Jean Pecquet.

== Description ==
Pesquet's parrot is a large parrot with a total length of approximately 46 cm (18 in) and a weight of 680–800 g (24–28 oz). Its plumage is black, with greyish scaling on the chest, and a bright red belly, uppertail coverts and wing-panels. The adult male has a small dull red spot behind the eye, which is not present in females. The red is duller in immatures. Compared to most other parrots, Pesquet's parrot appears unusually small-headed, in part due to its bare black facial skin and its long, hooked bill that is adapted for eating fruit. This vulture-like profile is the reason behind its alternative common names.

== Behaviour ==
Pesquet's parrot is a highly specialised frugivore, feeding almost exclusively on a few species of figs, but also on other fruit including mangos. Flowers and nectar are also eaten. In parts of its range, it is seasonally nomadic in response to the availability of fruit. The bare part of the head is presumably an adaptation to avoid feather-matting from sticky fruit.

Little is known about its breeding habits in the wild. Typically, it lays two eggs in a nest in a large hollow in a tree. Birds have been reported in breeding condition between February and May, and fledged juveniles seen in December.

Pesquet's parrot is typically seen in pairs or groups up to 20 individuals. In flight, it alternates between rapid flapping and short glides.

== Status ==
Its feathers are highly prized. This, combined with high prices in aviculture, has resulted in overhunting. Habitat loss also presents an ongoing problem. For these reasons, it is evaluated as Vulnerable on the IUCN Red List of Threatened Species. Pesquet's parrot is listed on Appendix II of CITES.

== Gallery ==
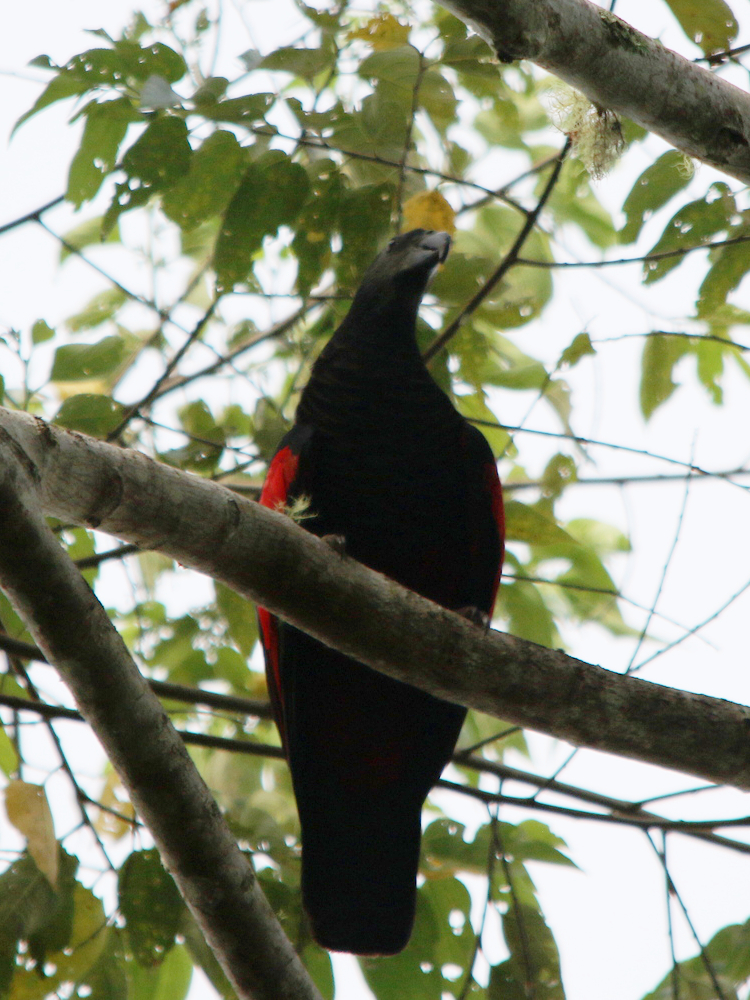
In the Arfak Mountains, West Papua, Indonesia

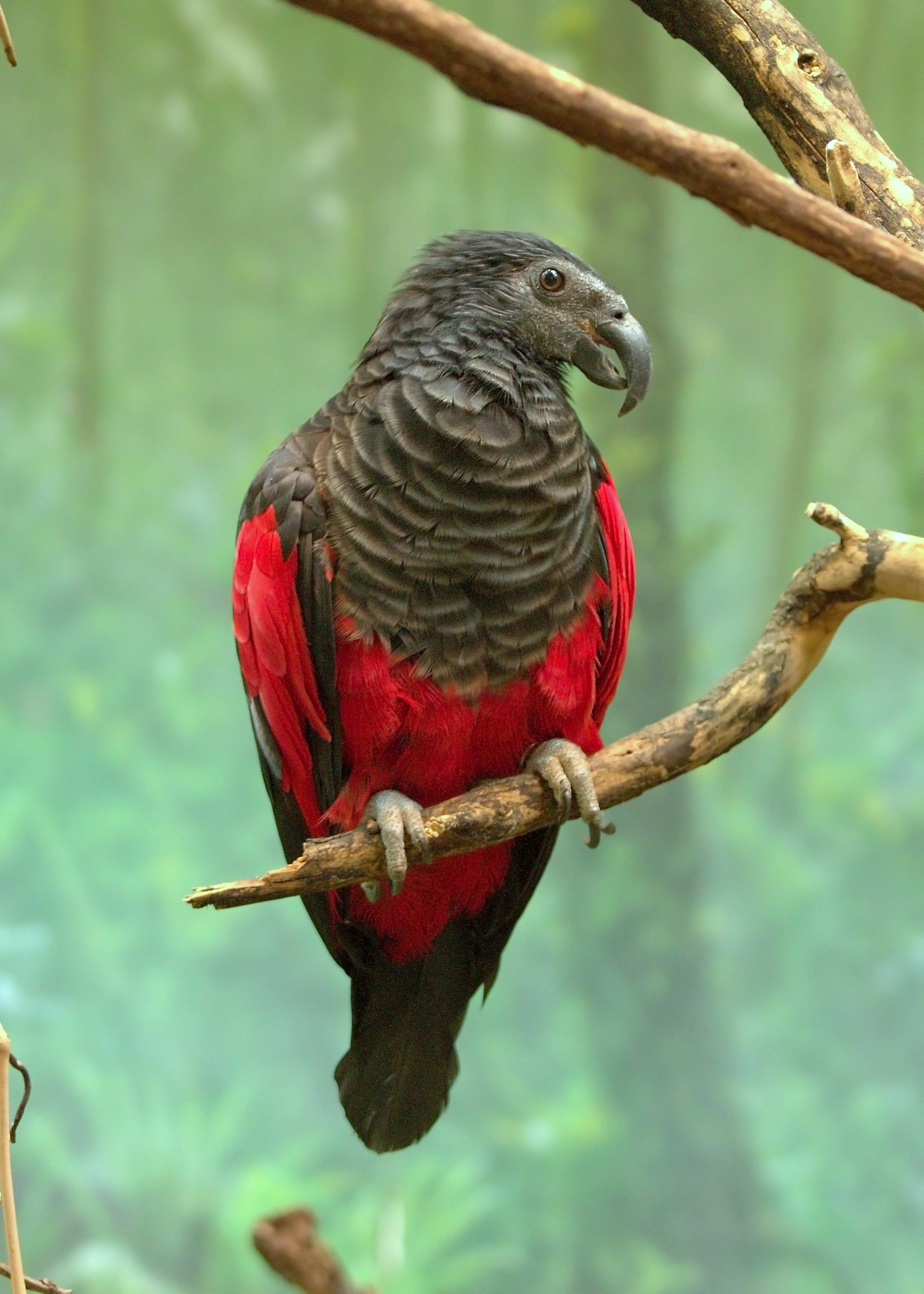
Female at Cincinnati Zoo
