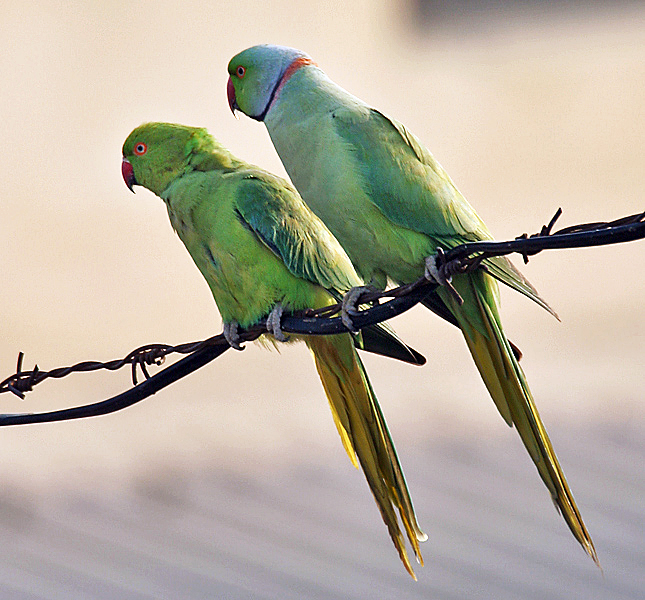
- Rose-ringed parakeets (Psittacula krameri)

Scientific classification
- Kingdom: Animalia
- Phylum: Chordata
- Class: Aves
- Order: Psittaciformes
- Superfamily: Psittacoidea
- Family: Psittaculidae; Vigors, 1825

Subfamilies
- Agapornithinae; Loriinae; Platycercinae; Psittacellinae; Psittaculinae

= Psittaculidae =

Family of birds

Psittaculidae is a family of parrots, commonly known as Old World parrots, though this term is a misnomer, as not all its members occur in the Old World, and the Psittacinae also occurs in the Old World. It consists of five subfamilies: Agapornithinae, Loriinae, Platycercinae, Psittacellinae and Psittaculinae.

== Taxonomy ==
The following cladogram shows how the family Psittaculidae relates to the three other families in the order Psittaciformes. The tree is based on the work by Leo Joseph and collaborators published in 2012 but with the choice of families and the number of species in each family taken from the list maintained by Frank Gill, Pamela Rasmussen and David Donsker on behalf of the International Ornithological Committee (IOC), now the International Ornithologists' Union. Joseph and collaborators proposed that the genera Psittrichas and Coracopsis should be placed in their own family, Psittrichasidae. This proposal has not been adopted by taxonomists involved in curating lists of the world birds and instead these two genera are included in an expanded family Psittaculidae.

- Psittaciformes
  - Strigopidae – New Zealand parrots (4 species)
  - - Cacatuidae – Cockatoos (22 species)
    - Psittacoidea
      - Psittacidae – African and New World parrots (180 species)
      - - Psittrichasiidae – Black Parrots (5 species)
        - Psittaculidae – Old World parrots (200 species)

The family Psittaculidae contains 200 species and is divided into 47 genera. Included are 13 species that have become extinct in historical times. The following cladogram showing the generic relationships is based on a molecular phylogenetic study by Brian Smith and collaborators that was published in 2023. In the analysis two pairs of genera were found not to be monophyletic. These were Psittacula with Tanygnathus and Cyclopsitta with Psittaculirostris. The number of species in each genus is taken from the taxonomy published by the AviList team.

- - Psittrichasidae
    - Psittrichas – Pesquet's parrot
    - Coracopsis – parrots (4 species)
  - Psittaculidae
    - Psittaculinae
      - Micropsitta – pygmy parrots (6 species)
      - - Polytelini
          - Alisterus – king parrots (3 species)
          - - Aprosmictus – parrots (2 species)
            - Polytelis – parrots (3 species)
        - Psittaculini
          - Prioniturus – racket-tails (10 species)
          - - Eclectus – eclectus parrots (5 species)
            - - Geoffroyus – parrots (3 species)
              - - Psittinus – parrots (2 species)
                - Psittacula, Tanygnathus – parakeets, parrots (16 + 5 species)
    - - Psittacellinae
        Psittacella – tiger parrots (4 species)
      - - Platycercinae
          - Pezoporini
            - Pezoporus – parrots (2 species)
            - - Neopsephotus – Bourke's parrot
              - Neophema – parrots (6 species)
          - Platycercini
            - - Lathamus – swift parrot
              - - Prosopeia – shining parrots (3 species)
                - - Eunymphicus – parakeets (2 species)
                  - Cyanoramphus – parakeets (9 species)
            - - - Barnardius – Australian ringneck
                - Platycercus – rosellas (6 species)
              - - Psephotus – red-rumped parrot
                - - Northiella – bluebonnets (2 species)
                  - - Purpureicephalus – red-capped parrot
                    - Psephotellus – parrots (4 species)
        - - Agapornithinae
            - Bolbopsittacus – guaiabero
            - - Agapornis – lovebirds (9 species)
              - Loriculus – hanging parrots (15 species)
          - Loriinae
            - Cyclopsittini
              - Cyclopsitta – fig parrots (4 species)
              - Nannopsittacus – fig parrots (3 species)
            - - Melopsittacus – budgerigar
              - Loriini
                - Oreopsittacus – plum-faced lorikeet
                - - - Charminetta – pygmy lorikeet
                    - - Hypocharmosyna – lorikeets (2 species)
                      - - Charmosynopsis – lorikeets (2 species)
                        - - Charmosyna – lorikeets (4 species)
                          - Vini – lorikeets (12 species)
                  - - Neopsittacus – lorikeets (2 species)
                    - - Lorius – lories (6 species)
                      - - Psitteuteles – lorikeets (3 species)
                        - - Chalcopsitta – lories (5 species)
                          - - Glossoptilus – Goldie's lorikeet
                            - Trichoglossus – lorikeets (22 species)
