= Bluetail =

Bluetail may refer to:

- Either of two bird species:
  - Red-flanked bluetail (Tarsiger cyanurus)
  - Himalayan bluetail (Tarsiger rufilatus)
- Various damselflies in the genus Ischnura
