= Blue parrot =

Blue parrot or Blue Parrot may refer to:

== Birds ==
- Blue-backed parrot, a parrot endemic to the Philippines, Sulawesi and nearby islands in Indonesia
- Blue-bellied parrot, a species of parrot from southeastern Brazil
- Blue-cheeked parrot, a species of parrot found in northeast South America
- Blue-collared parrot, a species of parrot found in the higher elevations of New Guinea.
- Blue-fronted parrot, a South American species of parrot
- Blue-headed parrot, a Central and South American species of parrot
- Blue-naped parrot, a parrot from the Philippines and Borneo
- Blue-rumped parrot, a small parrot from south-east Asia
- Blue-winged parrot, a small parrot from Tasmania and south-east mainland Australia
- Blue-and-yellow macaw, a species of parrot resident in tropical South America and Miami-Dade County, Florida
- Anodorhynchus, a genus of large blue macaws from South America genus of large blue macaws from South America
  - Glaucous macaw, an all-blue macaw believed to be extinct
  - Hyacinth macaw, a blue macaw that is the longest and largest flying parrot
  - Lear's macaw, an all-blue Brazilian parrot

== Other uses ==
- The Blue Parrot, a 1953 film
- The Blue Parrot (book), a book by John Moore
- The Blue Parrot, the cafe in the film Casablanca owned by Sidney Greenstreet's character
- Blue Parrot, the AIRPASS II radar system
