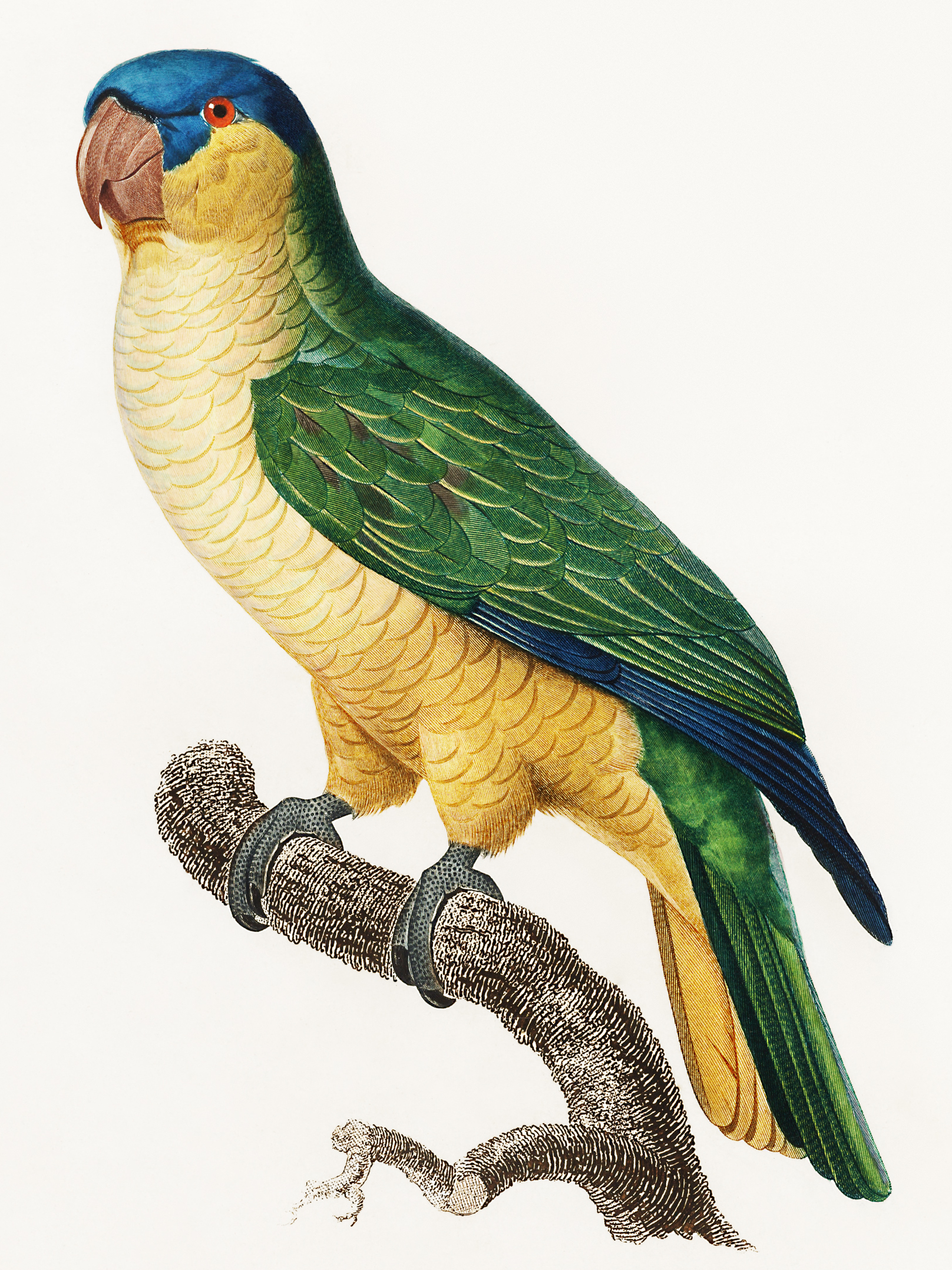

Conservation status
- Vulnerable (IUCN 3.1)

Scientific classification
- Kingdom: Animalia
- Phylum: Chordata
- Class: Aves
- Order: Psittaciformes
- Family: Psittaculidae
- Genus: Tanygnathus
- Species: T. gramineus

Binomial name
- Tanygnathus gramineus (Gmelin, JF, 1788)

= Black-lored parrot =

Species of bird

The black-lored parrot (Tanygnathus gramineus) also known as the Buru green parrot, is a parrot endemic to the Indonesian island of Buru. It is a 40 cm (16 in) long green parrot with black lores, and a turquoise crown. Males have red beaks, and females have gray-brown beaks, otherwise both the sexes look similar. The singing is high pitched and more protracted as compared to similar species, such as great-billed parrot.

== Taxonomy ==
The black-lored parrot was described in 1779 by the French polymath, the Comte de Buffon in his Histoire Naturelle des Oiseaux. He published a hand-coloured illustration in a separate publication. When in 1788 the German naturalist Johann Friedrich Gmelin revised and expanded Carl Linnaeus's Systema Naturae, he included the black-lored parrot with a short description, coined the binomial name Psittacus gramineus and cited Buffon's works. The black-lored parrot is now one of four species placed in the genus Tanygnathus that was introduced by the German naturalist Johann Wagler in 1832. The name Tanygnathus combines the Ancient Greek words tanuō "to stretch out" and gnathos "jaw". The specific epithet gramineus is from Latin and means "grasslike" or "green".

== Distribution and habitat ==
The bird is rare and either fully or partly nocturnal, and therefore is poorly described. Its behaviour was reported by the Dutch ornithologist Hendrik Cornelis Siebers (in 1930. The bird predominantly occupies the central, more elevated part of the island of Buru, Indonesia, where it was reported at the settlements of Gunung Tagalago, Wa Temun and Kunturun at elevations of 700–1,100 meters (2,300–3,600 ft), as well on the southern lowlands at Fakal, Ehu and Leksula. There was one observation of these parrots near the Kayeli Bay at the eastern shores of Buru. More recent observations were made off the northern (Waflia) and northwestern (Wamlana) shores. The voice of the black-lored parrot was frequently heard at Kunturun, mostly 1–7 hours after the sunset, where the locals called the bird "kakatua ol'biru", meaning blue-headed parrot. However, it was caught during the day with slingshots in fruit trees suggesting that its activity is not purely nocturnal. Migration is relatively weak and there are only few reports of the parrots flying up and down hill at high altitudes overnight, as judged from their voices.

The population density of black-lored parrot is estimated as 1.3–19 birds/km^{2}. These birds apparently favor high-altitude forests which on Buru have areas of 1,789 km^{2} above 900 m, and 872 km^{2} above 1,200 m. Those forests are relatively untouched by logging which affects coastal areas. Hunting or capturing of these birds by locals is rather limited, and there is only one report of the locals selling a captured black-lored parrot at a market of the nearby Ambon Island in 1998.

Nevertheless, owing to the small habitat, the species were listed as vulnerable since 1994 by the International Union for Conservation of Nature. The establishment of two protected areas on Buru, Gunung Kapalat Mada (1,380 km^{2}) and Waeapo (50 km^{2}), are partly aimed at preserving the habitat of the black-lored parrot.
