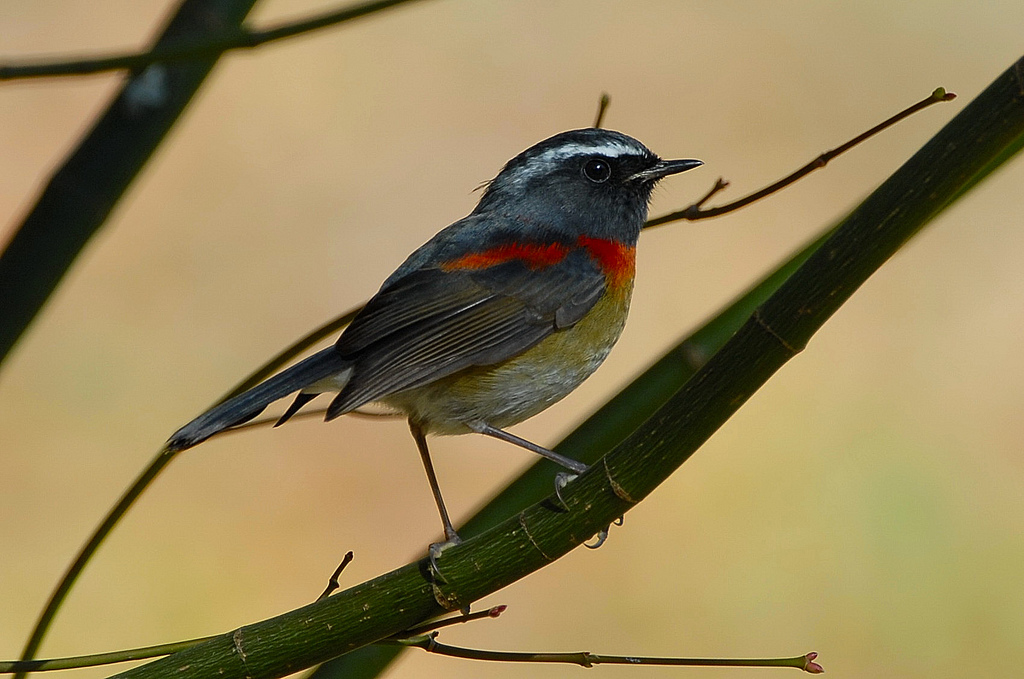

Conservation status
- Least Concern (IUCN 3.1)

Scientific classification
- Kingdom: Animalia
- Phylum: Chordata
- Class: Aves
- Order: Passeriformes
- Family: Muscicapidae
- Genus: Tarsiger
- Species: T. johnstoniae

Binomial name
- Tarsiger johnstoniae (Ogilvie-Grant, 1906)

= Collared bush robin =

Species of bird

The collared bush-robin or Johnstone's robin (Tarsiger johnstoniae) is a species of bird in the family Muscicapidae. It is endemic to Taiwan, living in montane and subalpine forests. The International Union for Conservation of Nature (IUCN) has assessed it as a least-concern species.

== Taxonomy ==
This species was described as Ianthia johnstoniae by William Robert Ogilvie-Grant in 1906: the specimens were collected by Walter Goodfellow on Yushan (Mount Morrison). It has also been included in the genus Luscinia. The species' eponym is named after Marion A. Johnstone, a well-known aviculturist to whom Goodfellow previously sent a specimen of a lorikeet.

== Description ==
The collared bush-robin is about 12 cm (4.7 in) long. The male and female are different. The male has a slate-black head with a white supercilium. The rufous upper breast, mantle and scapulars form a collar. The back is sooty-black, the wings are black and brownish-black, and the tail is black. The lower breast is buffish-yellow, and the belly varies from grey-white to buffish-olive. The beak and legs are black. The female has a less distinct supercilium. The upperparts are mostly dull olive-brown, and the wings and tail are dark brown. The underparts are variable. The throat and breast are warm brown, but the throat is sometimes blackish, and the breast can be pale yellow or yellowish-olive. The juvenile bird can be distinguished from the female by its pale buff streaks and spots.

== Distribution and habitat ==
Endemic to Taiwan, this robin's habitat is montane and subalpine forests, usually at elevations of 2,000–2,800 m (6,600–9,200 ft) and sometimes above the tree line. It descends to lower elevations in winter. It lives in undergrowth of coniferous forests with shrubs and bamboo. It can also be seen in parks and along roads.

== Behaviour ==
The collared bush-robin is often seen in pairs and also singly. It catches insects by striking from perches, and it also forages for invertebrates on the ground and in low plants. Its calls include tuc notes with pi notes in between, a low grruit, and a combination of piping and grating notes. It sings from a perch, giving a series of phrases each consisting of two or three high-pitched, sibilant notes. Breeding occurs from March to August, and there are two broods per year. A territory is defended by the male and female. The female builds a cup nest made of plants and lays two to three eggs. The collared bush-robin sometimes hybridises with subspecies formosanus of the white-browed bush robin.

== Status ==
Suspected to have a stable population, this species has been assessed by the IUCN as being of least concern.

== See also ==
- List of protected species in Taiwan
- List of endemic species of Taiwan
- List of endemic birds of Taiwan
