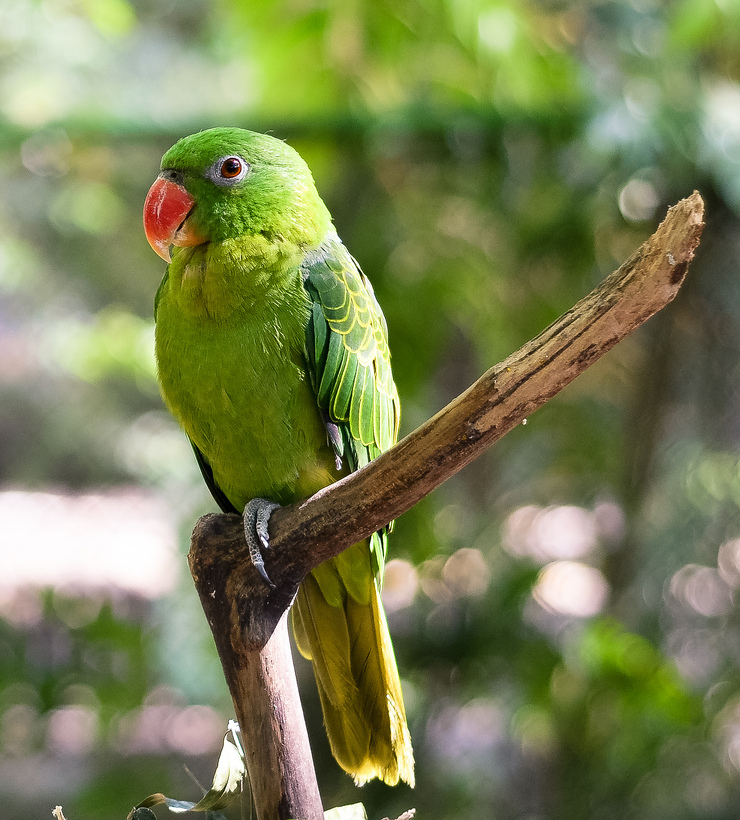
- Male

Conservation status
- Endangered (IUCN 3.1)

Scientific classification
- Kingdom: Animalia
- Phylum: Chordata
- Class: Aves
- Order: Psittaciformes
- Family: Psittaculidae
- Genus: Tanygnathus
- Species: T. everetti

Binomial name
- Tanygnathus everetti Tweeddale, 1877

= Blue-backed parrot =

Species of bird

The blue-backed parrot (Tanygnathus everetti), also known as Müller's (or Mueller's) parrot and Burbridge's parrot (for the Sulu subspecies) is a large, endangered species of parrot endemic to the Philippines. It is found in tropical moist lowland forest but is now feared locally extinct in a large part of its range including Negros, Panay, Leyte, Luzon and Polilio. The only recent records are in Samar, Mindanao and Tawi-tawi with the population being estimated below 250 individuals. Flocks are small and often active at night. Its main threats are habitat loss and trapping for the pet trade.

It is illegal to hunt, capture or possess blue-backed parrots under Philippine Law RA 9147.

== Description ==
It is of medium size (32 cm), primarily green with yellowish edging to the wings, a blue rump, and blue wing bends. The head, mantle, wings and tail are darker green, the belly and collar are lighter green. It is sexually dimorphic, with the male having a red beak and the female a pale yellow or horn colored beak.

It is often confused for the Blue-naped parrot, but is differentiated by its red iris, more plain green plummage on wings, more pronounced sexual dimorphism, slightly larger size and vocalizations. In the Sulu archipelago where both species are still present, it prefers more inland and deep forest compared to the Blue-naped parrot.

== Taxonomy ==
It was previously conspecific with the azure-rumped parrot (T. sumatranus), but was split as a distinct species by the IUCN Red List and BirdLife International in 2020, and the International Ornithological Congress followed suit in 2022. It can be differentiated from the azure-rumped parrot by its blue back and red iris vs. the azure-rumped parrot's yellow iris and plain green back.

=== Subspecies ===
Four subspecies are recognised:

- T. e. everetti Tweeddale, A, 1877 – Panay, Negros, Leyte, Samar, Mindanao. Mantle and back darker, rump and head lighter. Some blue in mantle. Red iris. Possibly locally extinct on Negros, Panay and Leyte.
- T. e. burbidgii Sharpe, RB, 1879 – Sulu Islands. Darker green with lighter collar. Red iris. Much larger at 40cm. May be reclassified as a separate species.
- T. e. duponti Parkes, KC, 1971 – Luzon. Dark green with yellow collar. Yellowish underwing coverts. Iris red. Last seen in the 1970s
- T. e. freeri McGregor, RC, 1910 – Polillo Islands. More uniform color with less contrast, more yellow on nape. Iris red. Last seen in 2004.

Recent studies published by the Oriental Bird Club, suggest that the evertti, duponti and freeri be lumped into one subspecies. Other sources recommend that burbidgii be further studied and possibly be elevated to a full species level.

== Diet and ecology ==
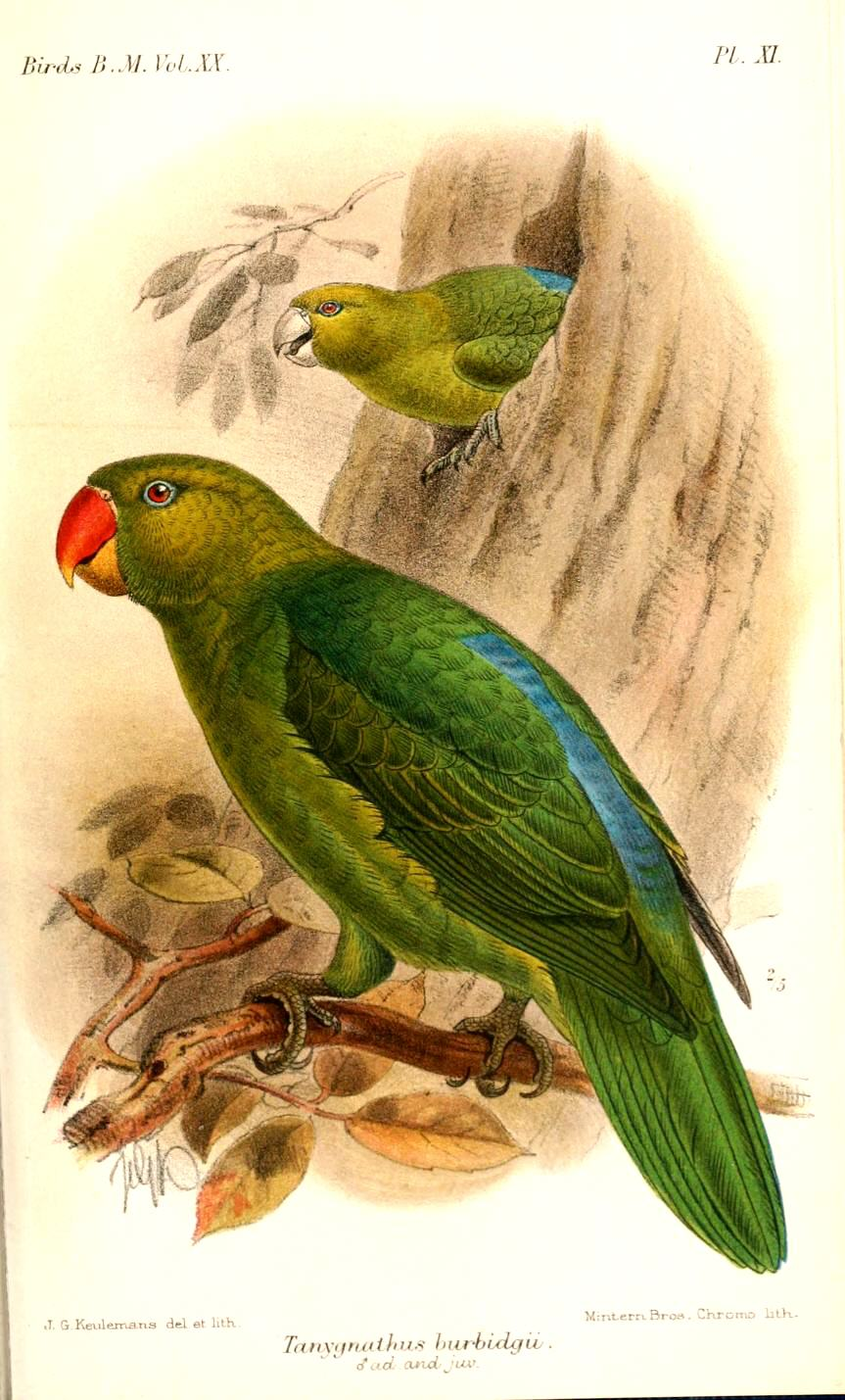
T. s. burdbigii, found in the Sulu Archipelago

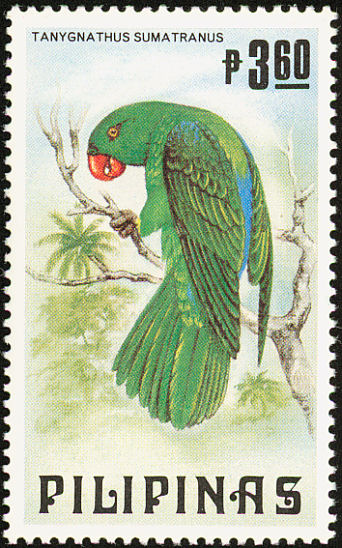
A Philippine postal stamp from 1984 featuring the Blue-backed parrot under the Tanygnathus sumatranus scientific before it was split with the Azure-rumped parrot

Often found in Leptospermum and Ficus trees where they feed. Otherwise diet is unknown but presumed to be similar to Blue-naped parrot which feeds on fruits and seeds. Reported breeding on Samar on April. It nests in tree cavities high up the ground.

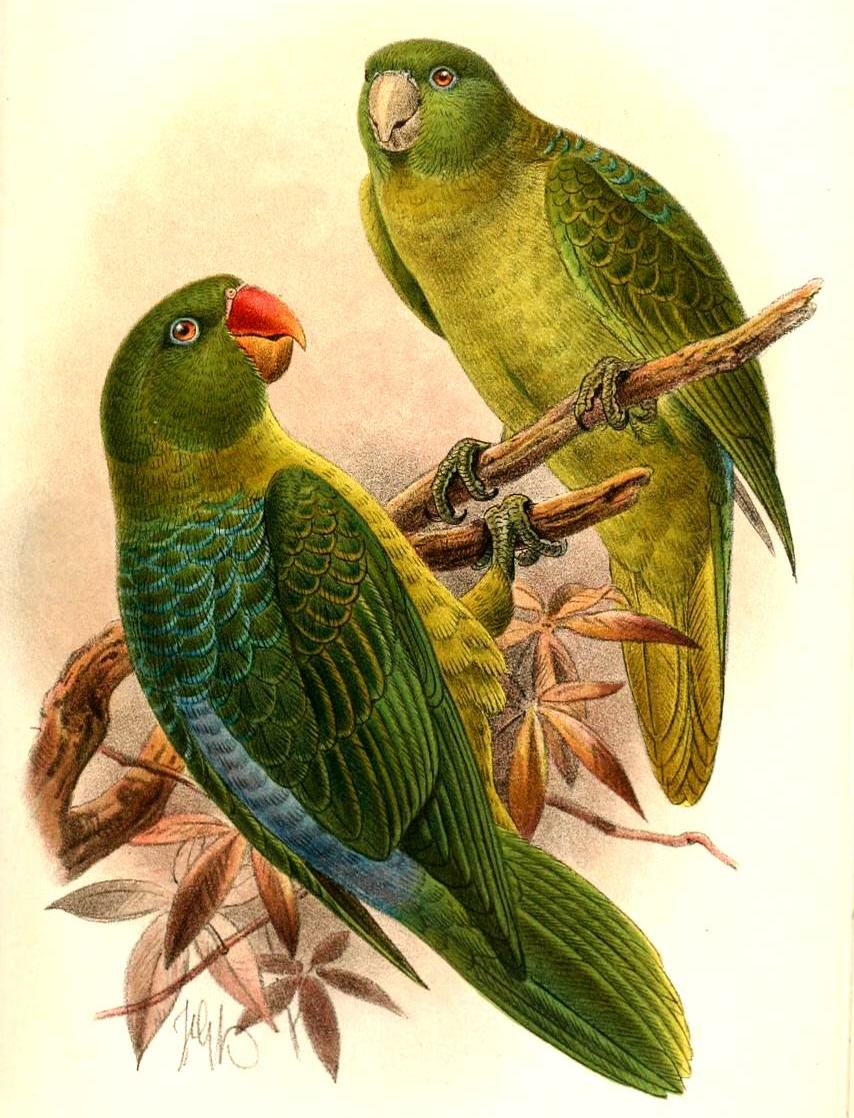
T. s. everetti

== Habitat ==
Very little is known about the ecology of the species, albeit it is likely to occur in similar habitats to the Azure-rumped parrot. The species may therefore occur across tropical, lowland, and montane forests, as well as mangrove swamps and degraded forests being most common below 500 meters above sea level.

== Conservation status ==
IUCN has assessed this bird as endangered with population estimates of 250–999 mature individuals remaining. Others suggest that the population may even be lower with the Oriental Bird Club citing "the Blue-backed Parrot is represented by a population of potentially far fewer than 300 birds, and a reasonable precaution would place this below 250 and allow the species to be registered as Critically Endangered." This bird is already listed as critically endangered under the National List of Threatened Terrestrial Fauna of the Philippines.

These population counts may be even lowered if the Sulu subspecies burdbdgii is elevated to the full species level.

Conservation actions proposed are surveys across the range of the species are urgently needed to assess the current population any ecological requirement and the impact of trade. Lowland forests across parts of the species's former range, including Luzon and Catanduanes also require ongoing monitoring. Methods of conservation and site protection in Samar and Mindanao must also continue. Instate biodiversity reserves or protected areas across the watersheds and mineral reserves of Dinagat Islands, where large parrots have previously been observed.

It is only confirmed present in one protected area, Samar Island Natural Park, and while protected on paper, deforestation and poaching continues. It is vital that the remaining forest habitat be protected in Tawi-Tawi.

A captive-breeding program requires urgent initiation. Captive birds of the two forms everetti and burbidgii must be sought out and acquired for management under government licence, bringing together a multidisciplinary team to oversee the work and develop an integrated ex-situ/in-situ conservation plan. Both subspecies must be kept separate in order to prevent potential Hybridization if or once these studies prove that they are a different species.
