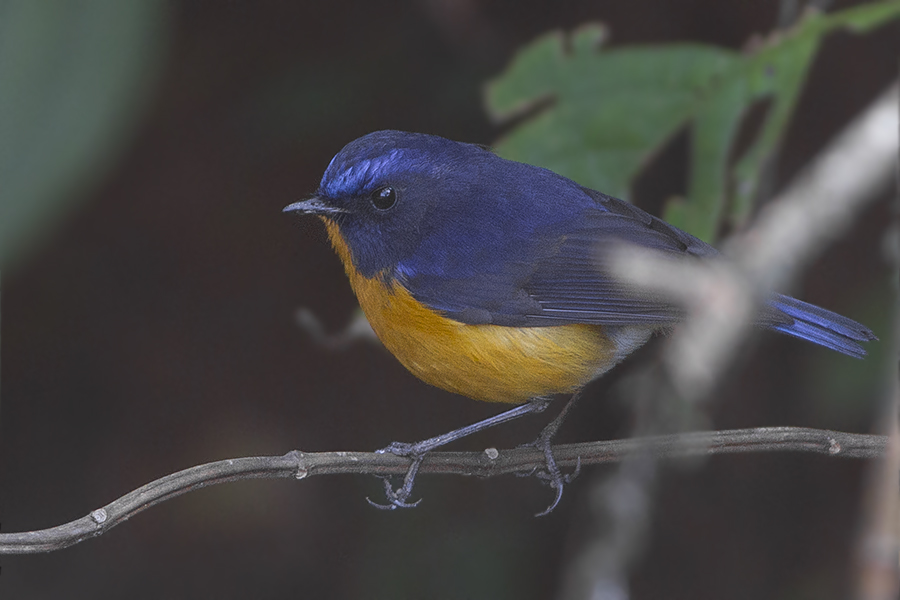
- Male (♂) from Pangolakha Wildlife Sanctuary, East Sikkim, India
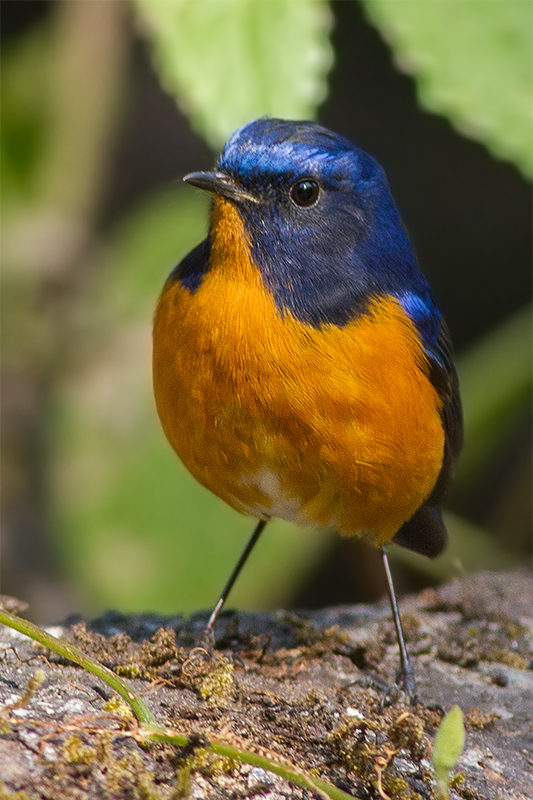
- Male in Eaglenest Wildlife Sanctuary, Arunachal Pradesh, India

Conservation status
- Least Concern (IUCN 3.1)

Scientific classification
- Kingdom: Animalia
- Phylum: Chordata
- Class: Aves
- Order: Passeriformes
- Family: Muscicapidae
- Genus: Tarsiger
- Species: T. hyperythrus

Binomial name
- Tarsiger hyperythrus (Blyth, 1847)

= Rufous-breasted bush robin =

Species of bird

The rufous-breasted bush robin (Tarsiger hyperythrus) is a species of bird in the family Muscicapidae. It is found in Bangladesh, Bhutan, southwestern China, northeast India, northern Myanmar and Nepal. Its natural habitat is temperate forests.

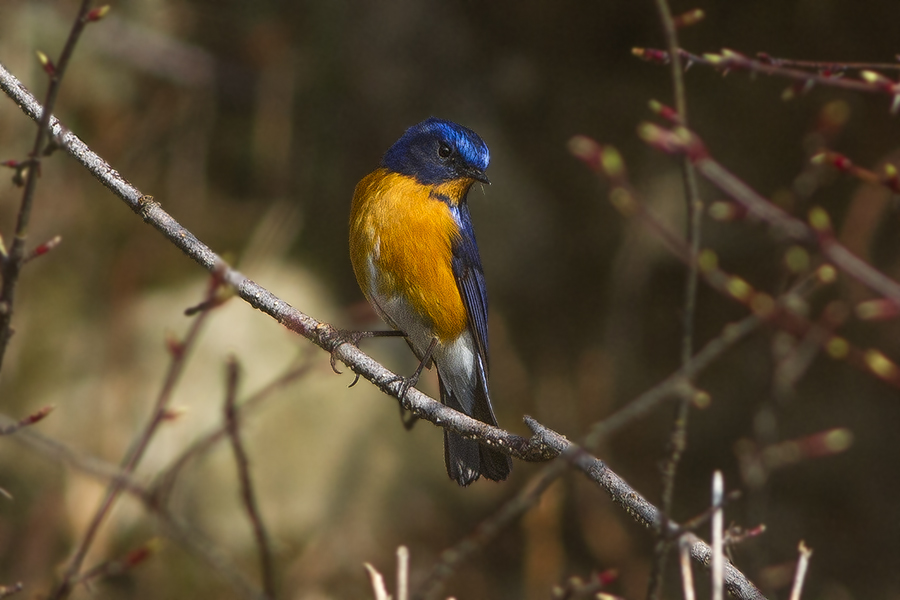
From Pangolakha Wildlife Sanctuary, East Sikkim, India.
