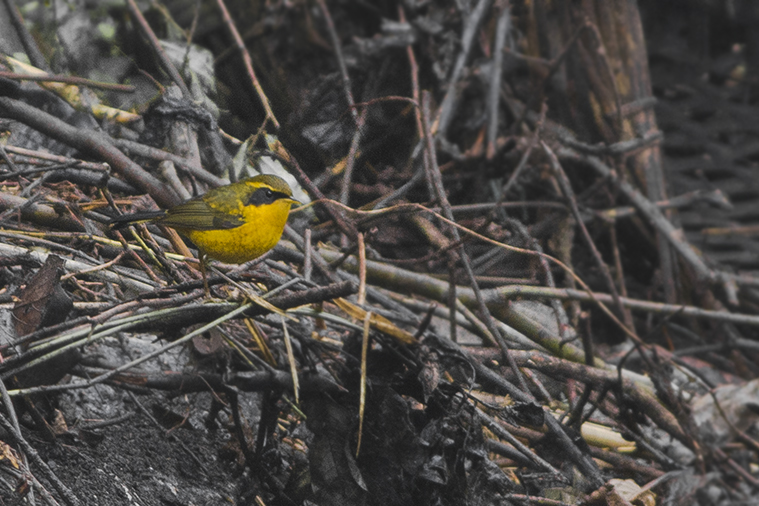
- Male (♂) from Khangchendzonga Biosphere Reserve, India
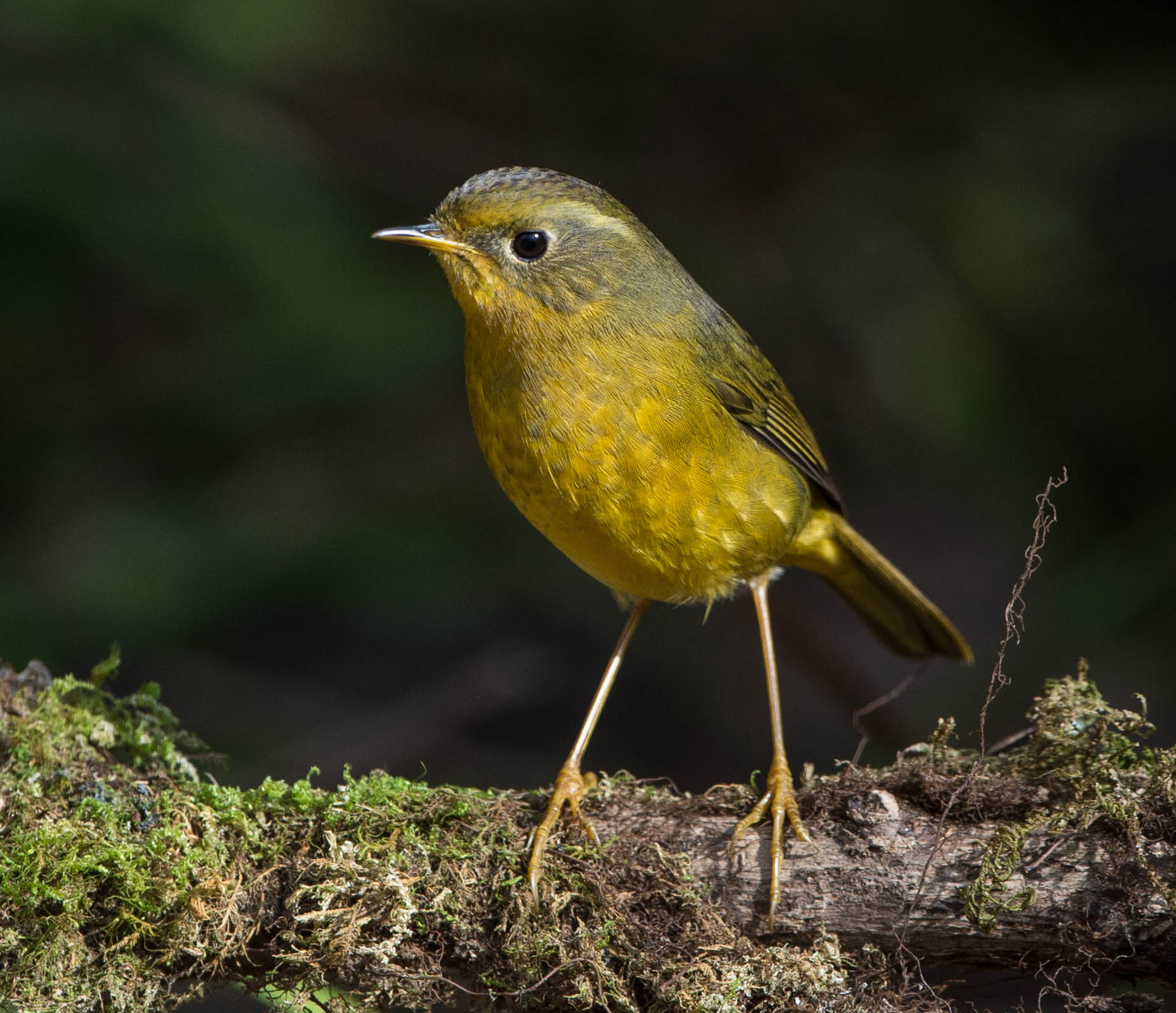
- Female (♀) from Chiang Mai, Thailand.

Conservation status
- Least Concern (IUCN 3.1)

Scientific classification
- Kingdom: Animalia
- Phylum: Chordata
- Class: Aves
- Order: Passeriformes
- Family: Muscicapidae
- Genus: Tarsiger
- Species: T. chrysaeus

Binomial name
- Tarsiger chrysaeus Hodgson, 1845

= Golden bush robin =

Species of songbird

The golden bush robin (Tarsiger chrysaeus) or golden bush-robin was first discovered in 1845 by Brian Houghton Hodgson, a British naturalist.

== Description ==
This species is typically a 14–15 cm long species of songbird in the family Muscicapidae known for its golden color. The weight of a full-grown bird ranges from 12 to 15 grams. The male golden bush robins mainly have a brownish olive tone on their backs with a bright yellow-orange tone on their underside. As for female golden bush robins, they consist of the same color patterns although they are duller and not as vibrant as their male counterparts. Color patterns for a male juvenile are dark brown with buff streaks above and below the tail, while the pattern diffuses in females.

== Diet ==
Golden bush robins are insectivorous and focus their hunts on insects closer to the ground.

== Habitat ==
Their habitat is dispersed around the Himalayan mountain range and surrounding highlands of Bhutan, China, India, Myanmar, Nepal, Pakistan, Tibet, and Thailand living mainly in open areas with temperate forests, bamboo forests, grassland, and shrubland. Golden bush robins, white-browed bush robins, chestnut-crowned bush warblers, and Gould's shortwings display rare cases of exploiting human disturbance in their primary temperate forest habitat in the mountains of southern China. This behavior is likely a modification of pre-existing dietary habits as human disturbance continues to exploit natural resources in the area.

== Subspecies ==
The golden bush robin has two known subspecies: Tarsiger chrysaeus whistleri, which is common in parts of northern Pakistan to the northwest Himalayan mountains; and the Tarsiger chrysaeus chrysaeus, which is common in parts of the central Himalayan mountains to northwest Thailand.

== Conservation status ==
The golden bush robin's population is deemed stable and they are considered as least concern when it comes to their conservation status. The range of the golden bush robin spans multiple countries, making it difficult to fully document population trends and threats to its population.

== Breeding ==
The breeding season for golden bush robins in Pakistan is from May to June. The female birds tend to lay 3 or 4 eggs and their incubation period is 14 or 15 days. The nests consist of compacted moss and grass that is lined with hair, wool, and feathers. The lifespan of a golden bush robin is around 3.8 years.

== Gallery ==
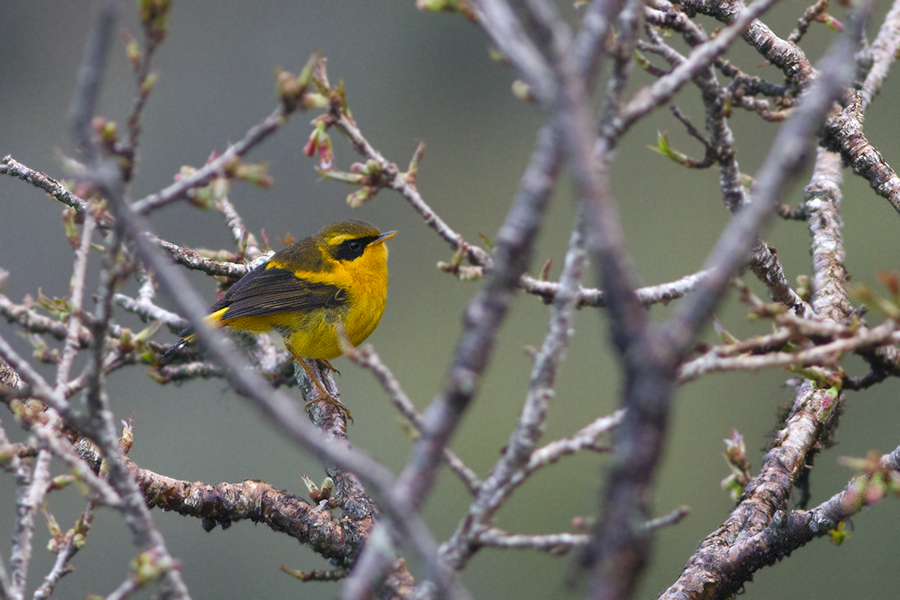
From Pangolakha Wildlife Sanctuary in East Sikkim, India.

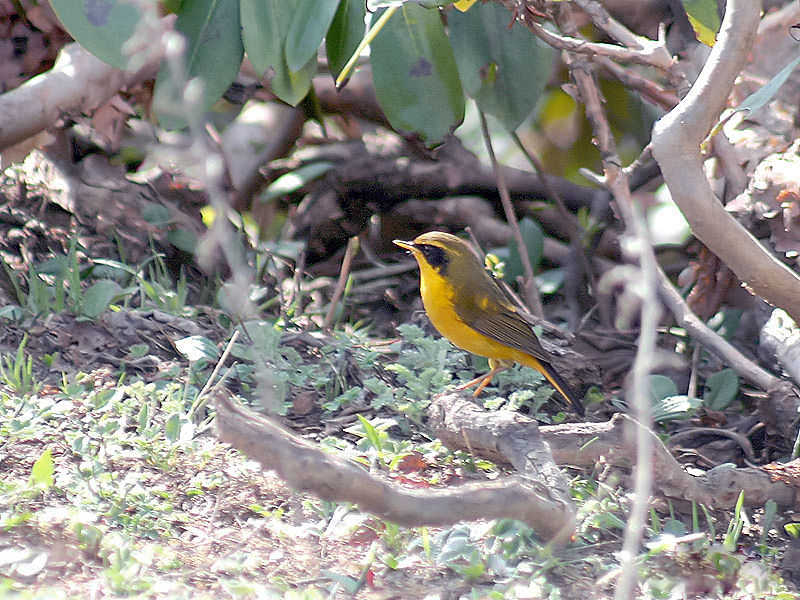
Male at Mailee Thaatch (11,000 ft.) in Kullu - Manali District of Himachal Pradesh, India

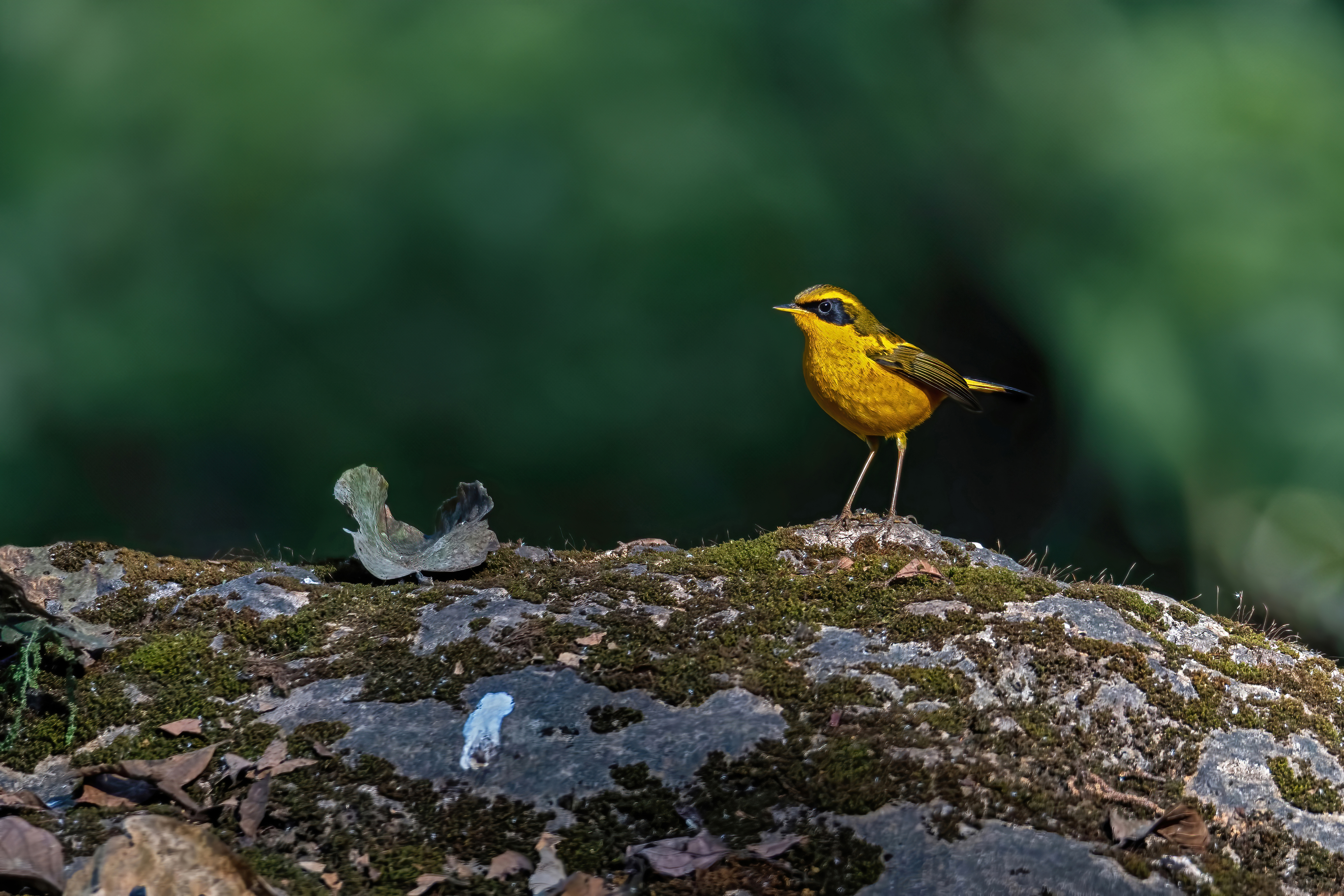
At Godawari forest, Nepal.

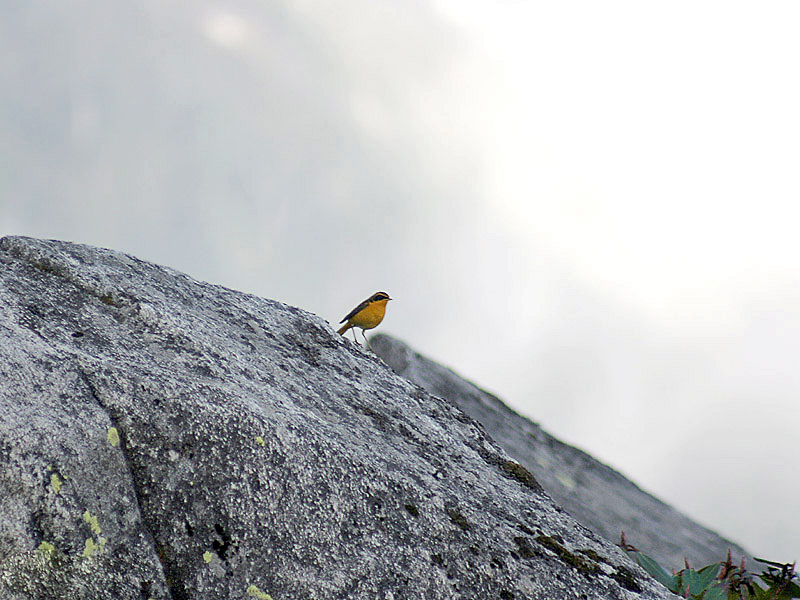
Male at 11,000 ft. in Kullu - Manali District of Himachal Pradesh, India
