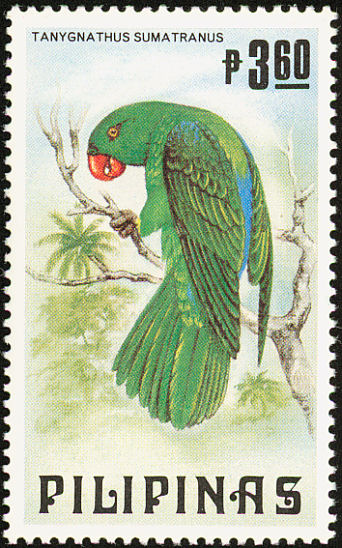
- Adult male on a postage stamp
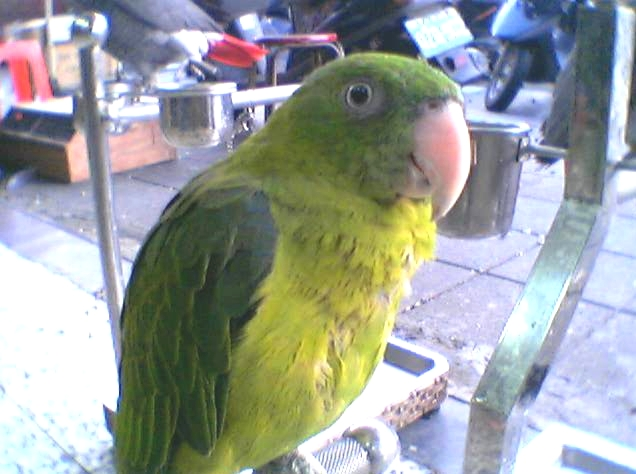
- Female in captivity

Conservation status
- Least Concern (IUCN 3.1)

Scientific classification
- Kingdom: Animalia
- Phylum: Chordata
- Class: Aves
- Order: Psittaciformes
- Family: Psittaculidae
- Genus: Tanygnathus
- Species: T. sumatranus

Binomial name
- Tanygnathus sumatranus (Raffles, 1822)

= Azure-rumped parrot =

Species of bird

The azure-rumped parrot (Tanygnathus sumatranus) is a large bird endemic to Indonesia. It is found in Sulawesi and the Sangir Islands. It was previously conspecific with the blue-backed parrot, which is differentiated with its red iris and blue back versus the azure-rumped parrot's yellow iris and plain back. It is found in forests. Flocks are small and often active at night. Its main threats are habitat loss and trapping for the pet trade.

== Taxonomy ==
There are two subspecies:

- Tanygnathus sumatranus sumatranus (Raffles, 1822): Sulawesi. Sulawesi and nearby islands. Yellow iris.
- Tanygnathus sumatranus sangirensis Meyer, AB & Wiglesworth, 1894: Sangir Islands and Karakelong. More blue on wing bends and wing coverts, head darker green. Yellow iris

Previously, only sumatranus was recognized, but sangirensis was also recognized by the International Ornithological Congress in 2022 based on phylogenetic evidence.

== Description ==
It is of medium size (32 cm), primarily green with yellowish edging to the wings, a blue rump, and blue wing bends. The head, mantle, wings and tail are darker green, the belly and collar are lighter green. It is sexually dimorphic, with the male having a red beak and the female a pale yellow or horn colored beak.
