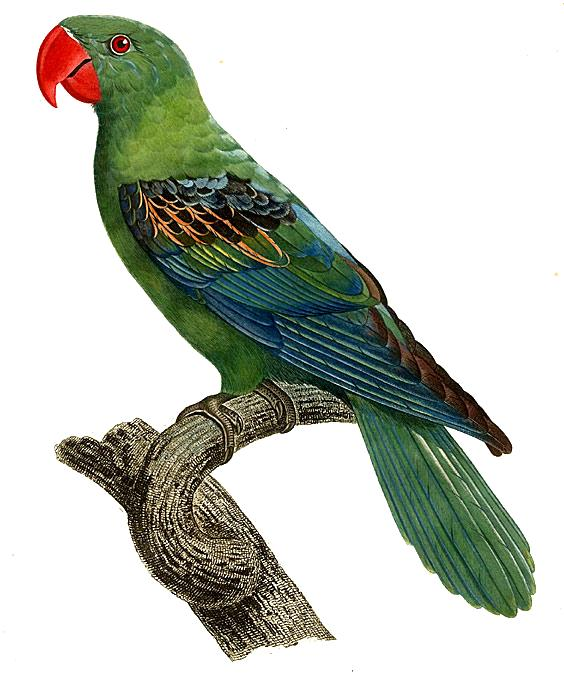
- Tanygnathus megalorynchos

Scientific classification
- Kingdom: Animalia
- Phylum: Chordata
- Class: Aves
- Order: Psittaciformes
- Family: Psittaculidae
- Tribe: Psittaculini
- Genus: Tanygnathus; Wagler, 1832

Species
- Tanygnathus gramineus Tanygnathus lucionensis Tanygnathus megalorynchos Tanygnathus everetti

= Tanygnathus =

Genus of birds

Tanygnathus is a genus of parrots in the Psittaculini tribe, of the superfamily of Psittacoidea (true parrots).

Its species are native to Southeast Asia and Melanesia.

== Taxonomy ==
The genus Tanygnathus was introduced by the German naturalist Johann Wagler in 1832. The type species was subsequently designated as the great-billed parrot (Tanygnathus megalorynchos) by the English zoologist George Robert Gray in 1840. The name Tanygnathus combines the Ancient Greek words tanuō "to stretch out" and gnathos "jaw".

The genus contains five species:

Image	Name	Distribution
	Great-billed parrot, Tanygnathus megalorynchos	islands of Maluku, Raja Ampat, Talaud, Sangir, Sarangani, the Lesser Sundas
	Blue-naped parrot, Tanygnathus lucionensis	Philippines
	Blue-backed parrot, Tanygnathus everetti	Philippines
	Black-lored parrot, Tanygnathus gramineus	the Indonesian island of Buru.
	Azure-rumped parrot, Tanygnathus sumatranus	Indonesia.

Genetic analysis has supported reclassifying all 4 species under Psittacula, making Tanygnathus a synonym of the former genus.
