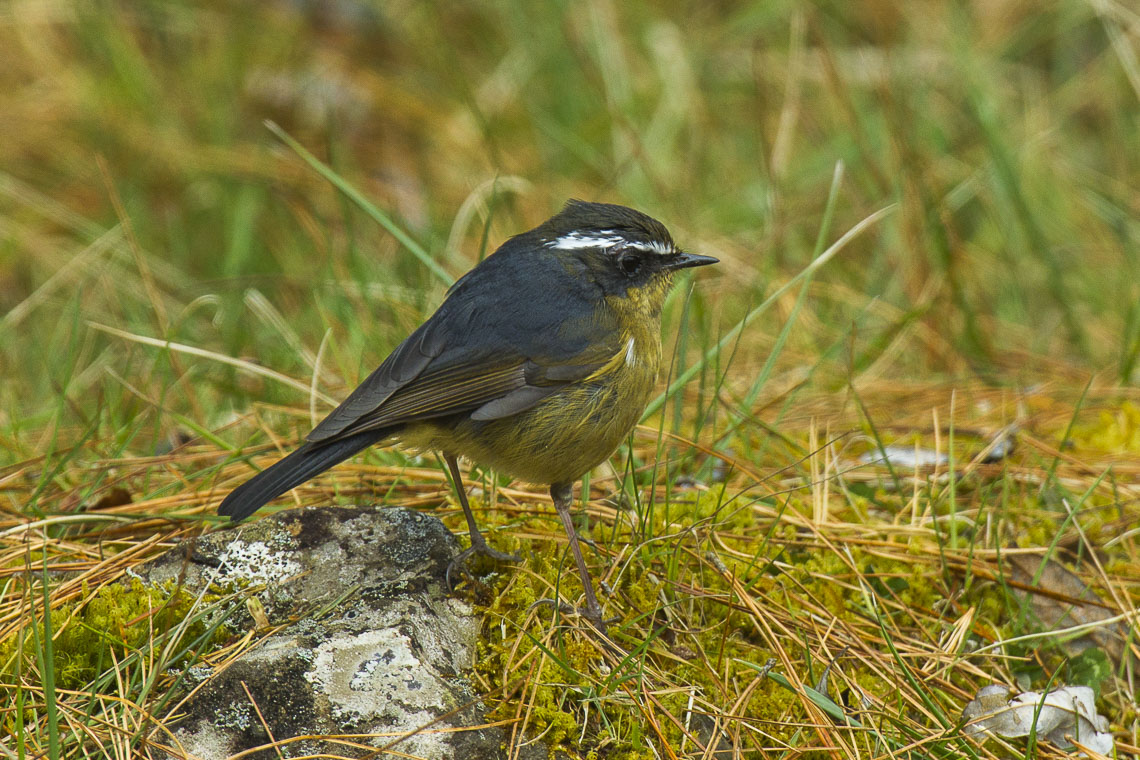

Conservation status
- Not evaluated (IUCN 3.1)

Scientific classification
- Kingdom: Animalia
- Phylum: Chordata
- Class: Aves
- Order: Passeriformes
- Family: Muscicapidae
- Genus: Tarsiger
- Species: T. formosanus

Binomial name
- Tarsiger formosanus Hartert, EJO, 1910

= Taiwan bush robin =

Species of bird

The Taiwan bush robin (Tarsiger formosanus) is a small passerine bird in the Old World flycatcher family Muscicapidae that is endemic to Taiwan. It was formerly considered as a subspecies of the white-browed bush robin (Tarsiger indicus).

== Taxonomy ==
The Taiwan bush robin was formally described in 1910 by the German ornithologist Ernst Hartert based on specimens collected on behalf of Alan Owston on the mountains of central Taiwan. Hartert considered the specimens to represent a subspecies of the white-browed bush robin (Tarsiger indicus) and coined the trinomial name Tarsiger indicus formosanus. Formosa is an alternative name for Taiwan. The Taiwan bush robin is now considered as a separate species based on a phylogenetic analysis published in 2022 as well as differences in plumage and vocalizations. The species is monotypic: no other subspecies are recognised.
