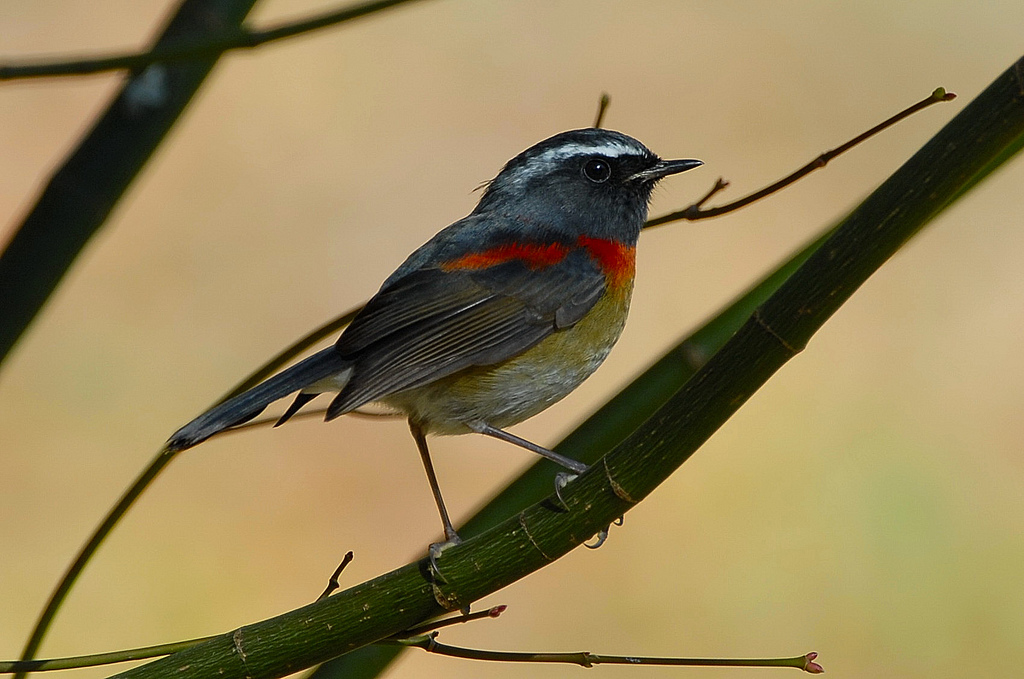
- Collared bush robin (Tarsiger johnstoniae)

Scientific classification
- Kingdom: Animalia
- Phylum: Chordata
- Class: Aves
- Order: Passeriformes
- Family: Muscicapidae
- Subfamily: Saxicolinae
- Genus: Tarsiger; Hodgson, 1845

Type species
- Tarsiger chrysaeus (golden bush robin) Hodgson, 1845

= Tarsiger =

Genus of birds

Tarsiger is a genus of eight species of birds in the family Muscicapidae. They are small, mostly brightly coloured insectivorous birds native to Asia and (one species) northeastern Europe; four of the six species are confined to the Sino-Himalayan mountain system. The genus has sometimes been included within the related genus Luscinia, but the species have been found to form a distinct monophyletic group.

== Taxonomy ==
The genus Tarsiger was introduced in 1845 by the English naturalist Brian Houghton Hodgson with the golden bush robin as the type species. The genus name is from Ancient Greek tarsos, "flat of the foot" and Latin gerere, "to carry".

The genus contains the following eight species:

- White-browed bush robin (Tarsiger indicus)
- Taiwan bush robin (Tarsiger formosanus) (split from T. indicus)
- Golden bush robin (Tarsiger chrysaeus)
- Collared bush robin (Tarsiger johnstoniae)
- Rufous-breasted bush robin (Tarsiger hyperythrus)
- Red-flanked bluetail (Tarsiger cyanurus)
- Qilian bluetail (Tarsiger albocoeruleus) (split from T. cyanurus)
- Himalayan bluetail (Tarsiger rufilatus)

The Himalayan bluetail was formerly treated as a subspecies of the red-flanked bluetail. It was split on the basis of its more intense plumage colours, and its ecology and behaviour, being a short-distance altitudinal migrant not a long-distance migrant.

The phylogenetic relationships between the species were determined in a molecular phylogenetic study published in 2022:

- Tarsiger
  - - Rufous-breasted bush robin (Tarsiger hyperythrus)
    - - - Red-flanked bluetail (Tarsiger cyanurus)
        - Qilian bluetail (Tarsiger albocoeruleus)
      - Himalayan bluetail (Tarsiger rufilatus)
  - - - Taiwan bush robin (Tarsiger formosanus)
      - White-browed bush robin (Tarsiger indicus)
    - - Collared bush robin (Tarsiger johnstoniae)
      - Golden bush robin (Tarsiger chrysaeus)
