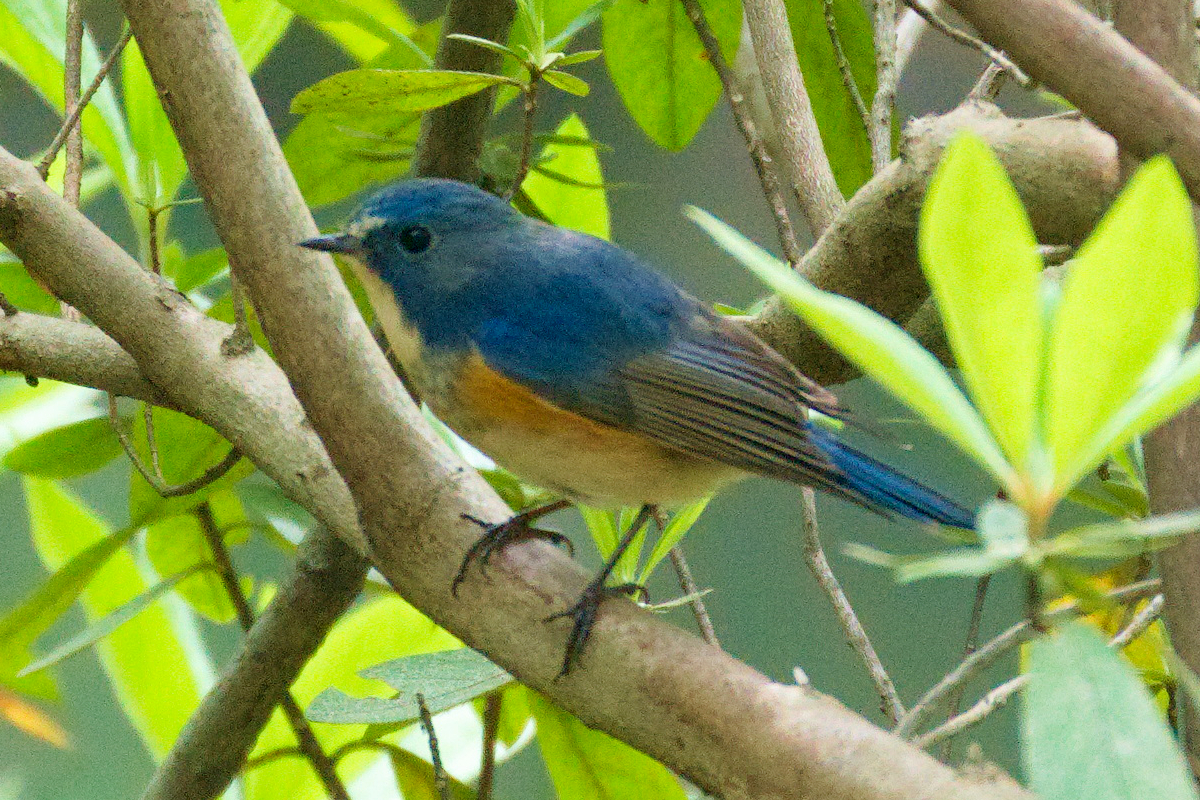

Scientific classification
- Kingdom: Animalia
- Phylum: Chordata
- Class: Aves
- Order: Passeriformes
- Family: Muscicapidae
- Genus: Tarsiger
- Species: T. albocoeruleus

Binomial name
- Tarsiger albocoeruleus Meise, 1937

= Qilian bluetail =

Species of bird

The Qilian bluetail (Tarsiger albocoeruleus) is a small passerine bird in the Old World flycatcher family Muscicapidae that is found in north-central China. It formerly considered as conspecific with the red-flanked bluetail (Tarsiger cyanurus).

== Taxonomy ==
The Qilian bluetail was formally described in 1937 by the German ornithologist Wilhelm Meise as a subspecies of Tarsiger cyanurus, the red-flanked bluetail. The epithet albocoeruleus combines the Latin albus meaning "white" with caeruleus meaning "blue". It was previously usually considered a synonym of T. cyanurus, until accepted by Hadoram Shirihai and Lars Svensson in 2018, and it was proposed to be a full species in a molecular phylogenetic study published in 2022. It has now been recognised by the IOC World Bird List, and the ebird/Clements Checklist. It is distinctive in genetics and vocalisation, but only marginally different in morphology. The males have bluer fore-supercilium, and less white than in red-flanked bluetail.
