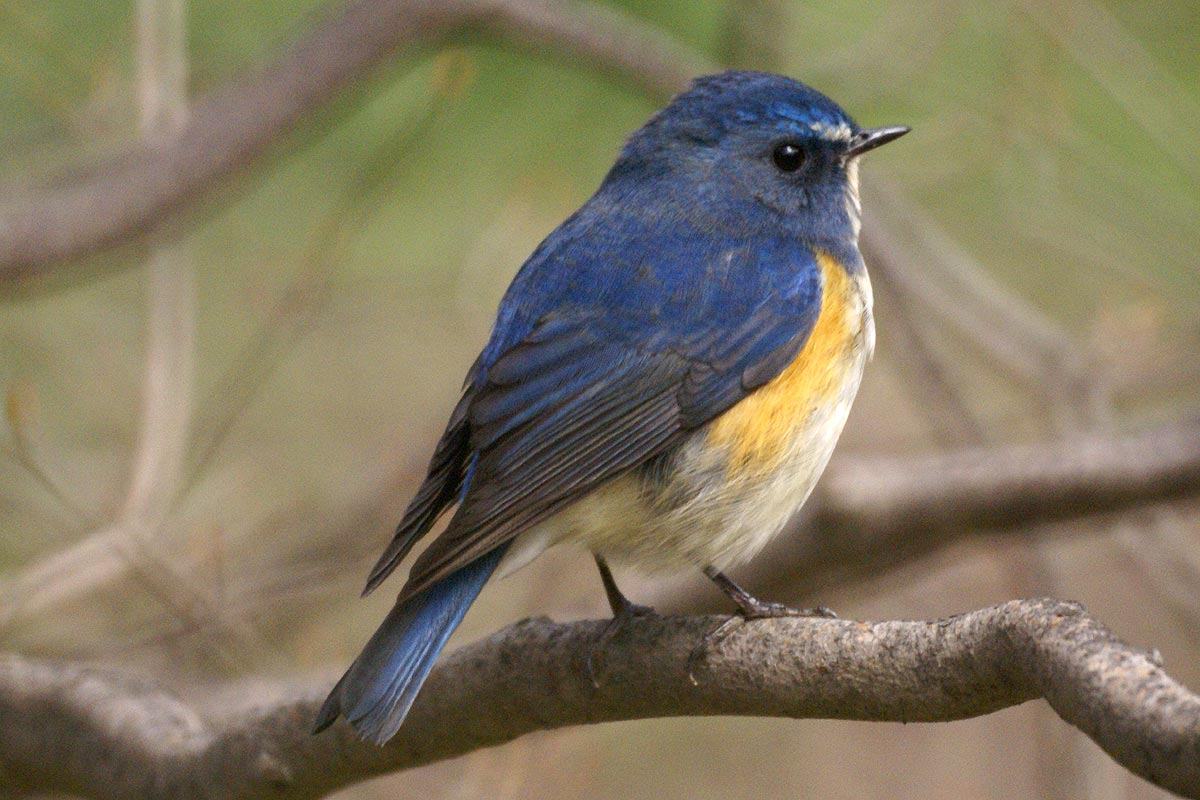
- Male
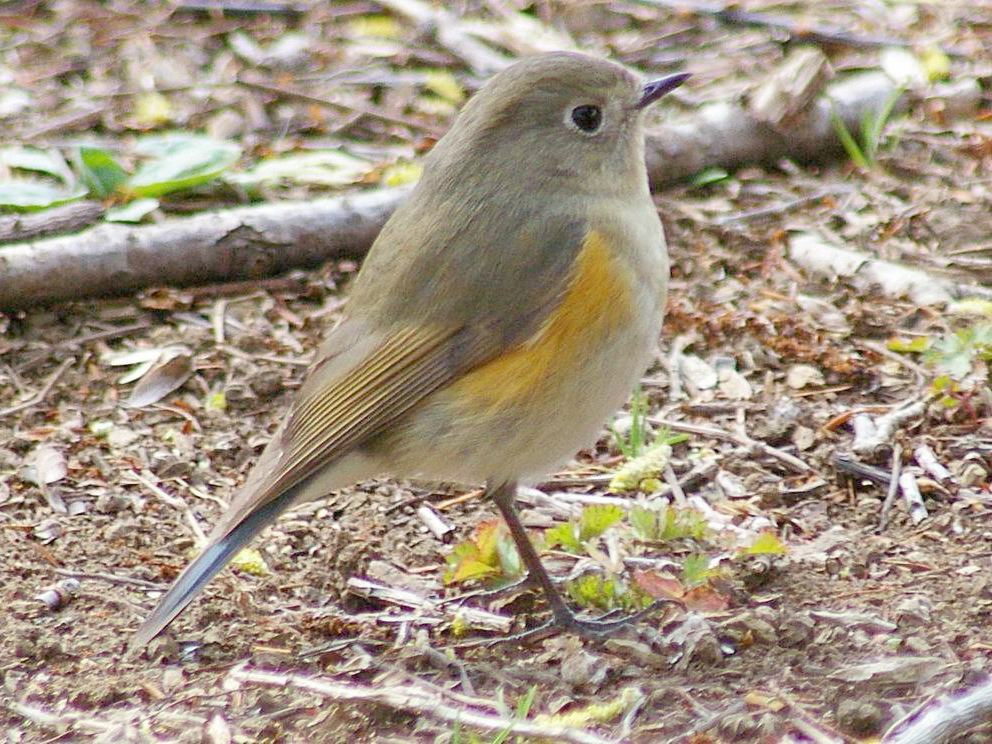
- Female

Conservation status
- Least Concern (IUCN 3.1)

Scientific classification
- Kingdom: Animalia
- Phylum: Chordata
- Class: Aves
- Order: Passeriformes
- Family: Muscicapidae
- Genus: Tarsiger
- Species: T. cyanurus

Binomial name
- Tarsiger cyanurus (Pallas, 1773)
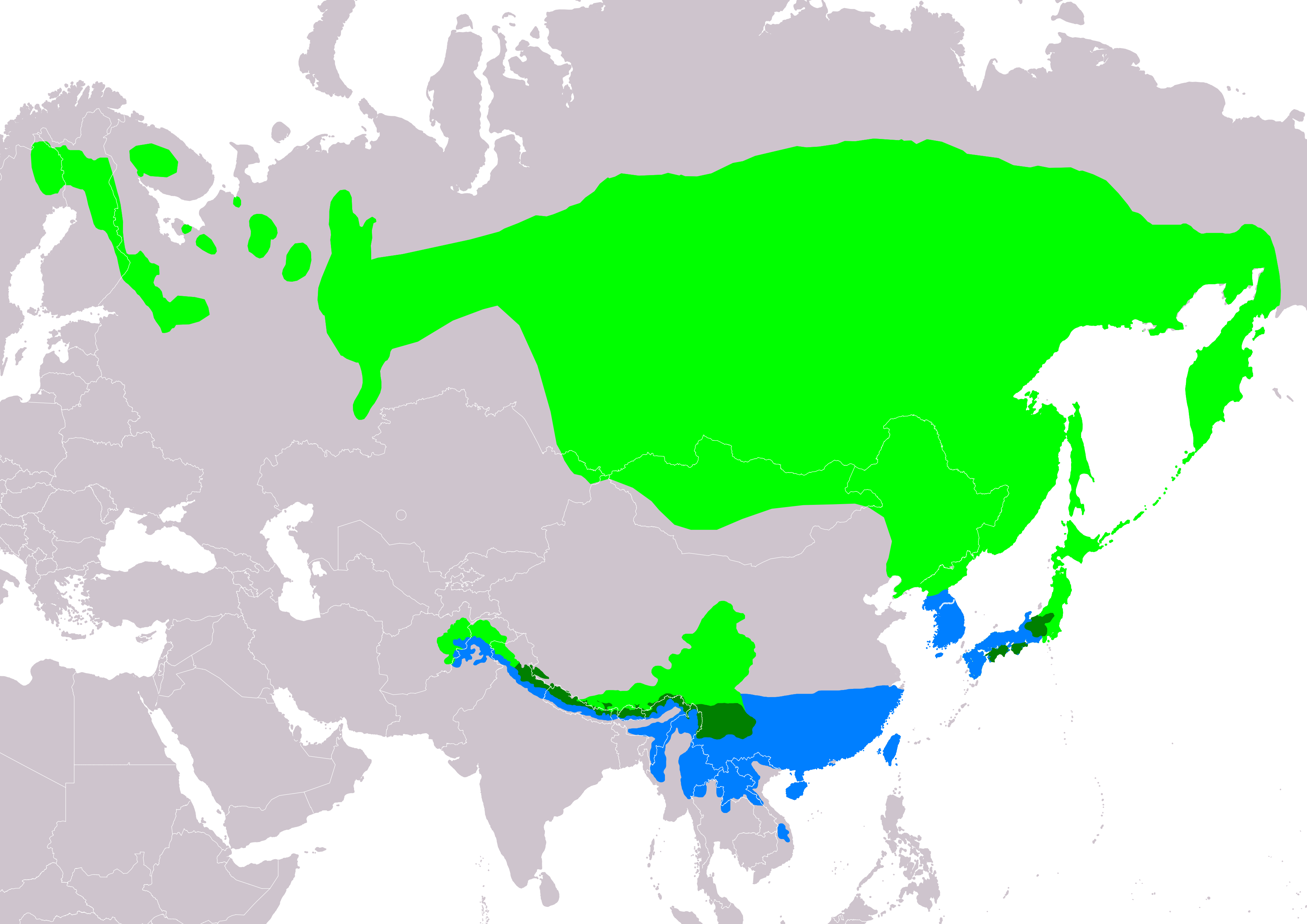
- Range of T. cyanurus Breeding Resident Non-breeding

Synonyms
- Luscinia cyanura Erithacus cyanurus

= Red-flanked bluetail =

Species of bird

The red-flanked bluetail (Tarsiger cyanurus), also known as the orange-flanked bush-robin, is a small passerine bird in the Old World flycatcher family. It breeds in mixed coniferous forests in northern Asia, parts of central Asia, and northeastern Europe. It is migratory, wintering mainly in southeast Asia, in the Indian subcontinent, the Himalayas, Taiwan, and northern Indochina.

== Taxonomy ==
The red-flanked bluetail was formally described in 1773 as Motacilla cyanurus by the German naturalist Peter Simon Pallas based on specimens seen near the Yenisei river in Russia. The specific epithet combines the Ancient Greek κυανος/kuanos meaning "dark-blue" with -ουρος/-ouros meaning "-tailed". The red-flanked bluetail is now placed in the genus Tarsiger that was introduced in 1845 by the English naturalist Brian Houghton Hodgson. The genus name is from Ancient Greek tarsos, "flat of the foot" and Latin gerere, "to carry".

The red-flanked bluetail belongs to a group of insectivorous birds known as chats, that were formerly thought to be thrushes. Genetic analysis showed that they were in fact a type of Old World flycatcher, with the resemblance to thrushes being the result of convergent evolution. In the past it was generally treated as comprising two subspecies, T. c. cyanurus breeding in northern Asia and T. c. rufilatus breeding in the Himalaya, it is now increasingly being treated as monotypic, with T. c. rufilatus split off as a distinct species, Himalayan bluetail T. rufilatus. The species has also been known by a variety of English and scientific names in the ornithological literature.

The subspecies albocoeruleus, distributed in north-central China, was described by Wilhelm Meise in 1937. It was usually considered invalid, until recognized by Hadoram Shirihai and Lars Svensson in 2018, and it is now proposed to be a full species, the Qilian bluetail (T. albocoeruleus), in a molecular phylogenetic study published in 2022. It is distinctive in genetics and vocalisation, but only marginally different in morphology. The males of albocoeruleus have bluer fore-supercilium, and less white than in cyanurus.

The table below details the treatments adopted by some major works, by publication date (newest first):

Publication	English name	Scientific name	Taxonomic notes
IOC standard list, version 2.5	Red-flanked bluetail	Tarsiger cyanurus	monotypic; excludes rufilatus
Collins Bird Guide	Red-flanked bluetail	Tarsiger cyanurus	
IOC standard list, version 1	Red-flanked bluetail	Tarsiger cyanurus	polytypic; includes rufilatus
Clements Checklist (6th edition)	Red-flanked bluetail	Tarsiger cyanurus	polytypic; includes rufilatus
Birds of South Asia	Northern red-flanked bush-robin	Tarsiger cyanurus	monotypic; rufilatus split off
HBW	Orange-flanked bush-robin	Tarsiger cyanurus	polytypic; includes rufilatus, although split suggested
Howard & Moore (3rd edition)	Orange-flanked bush-robin	Luscinia cyanura	polytypic; includes rufilatus
OBC Checklist	Orange-flanked bush-robin	Tarsiger cyanurus	polytypic; includes rufilatus
Howard & Moore (2nd edition)	Red-flanked bluetail	Tarsiger cyanurus	polytypic; includes rufilatus
BWP	Red-flanked bluetail	Tarsiger cyanurus	polytypic; includes rufilatus
Voous	Red-flanked bluetail or orange-flanked bush robin	Tarsiger cyanurus	polytypic; includes rufilatus

== Description ==
At 13–14 cm long and 10–18 g weight, the red-flanked bluetail is similar in size and weight to the common redstart and slightly smaller (particularly with a slimmer build) than the European robin. As the name implies, both sexes have a blue tail and rump, and orange-red flanks; they also have a white throat and greyish-white underparts, and a small, thin black bill and slender black legs. The adult male additionally has dark blue upperparts, while females and immature males are plain brown above apart from the blue rump and tail, and have a dusky breasts. In behaviour, it is similar to a common redstart, frequently flicking its tail in the same manner, and regularly flying from a perch to catch insects in the air or on the ground. The male sings its melancholy trill from treetops. Its call is a typical chat "tacc" noise. The nest is built on or near the ground, with 3–5 eggs which are incubated by the female.

== Distribution and habitat ==
The red-flanked bluetail breeds in mixed coniferous forests with undergrowth in northeastern Europe, from northern Sweden east across Siberia to Kamchatka and south to Japan. It winters mainly in southeastern Asia, in the Indian subcontinent, the Himalayas, Taiwan, and northern Indochina. The breeding range is slowly expanding westwards through Finland (where up to 500 pairs now breed), and it is a rare but increasing vagrant to Western Europe, mainly to Great Britain. There have also been a few records in North America, mostly in western Alaska as well as one on San Clemente Island off the southern California coast and one overwintering on the Central California coast in Santa Cruz, California, in 2023. One was also spotted in New Jersey in December 2023.
