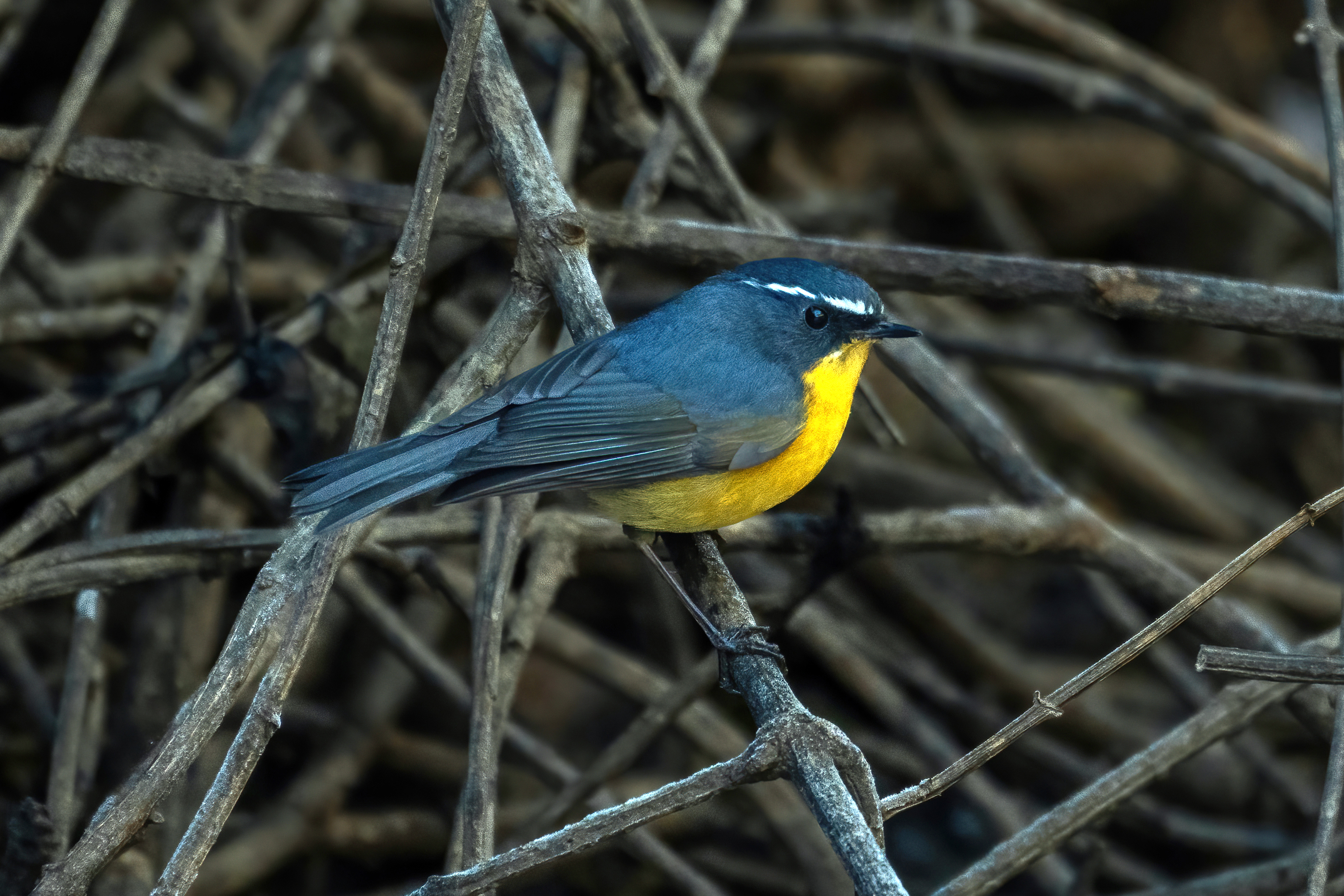
- In Phulchoki, Nepal

Conservation status
- Least Concern (IUCN 3.1)

Scientific classification
- Kingdom: Animalia
- Phylum: Chordata
- Class: Aves
- Order: Passeriformes
- Family: Muscicapidae
- Genus: Tarsiger
- Species: T. indicus

Binomial name
- Tarsiger indicus (Vieillot, 1817)

= White-browed bush robin =

Species of bird

The white-browed bush robin (Tarsiger indicus) is a species of passerine bird in the Old World flycatcher family Muscicapidae that is found from the Himalayas to south-central China and north Vietnam. Its natural habitat is Rhododendron and conifer forests. The Taiwan bush robin was formerly regarded as a subspecies.

== Taxonomy ==
The white-browed bush robin was formally described in 1817 by the French ornithologist Louis Vieillot under the binomial name Sylvia indica. Vieillot based his account on "Le rossignol de muraille des Indes" that had been described by Pierre Sonnerat in his "Voyage aux Indes orientales et à la Chine". The type locality was restricted to Darjeeling by E. C. Stuart Baker in 1921. The white-browed bush is now one of eight bush robins placed in the genus Tarsiger that was introduced by Brian Hodgson in 1845.

Two subspecies are recognised:

- T. i. indicus (Vieillot, 1817) – central, east Himalayas
- T. i. yunnanensis Rothschild, 1922 – north Myanmar, central south China and north Vietnam

The Taiwan bush robin (Tarsiger formosanus) was formerly regarded as a subspecies but is now considered as a separate species based both on a phylogenetic study published in 2022 as well as the differences in plumage and vocalizations.

== Description ==
White-browed bush robins display delayed plumage maturation—after becoming capable of breeding, first-year males (subadults) retain their juvenile plumage (similar to that of adult females) to avoid direct competition with older males.

== Behaviour ==
They perform altitudinal migration. They are insectivores.
