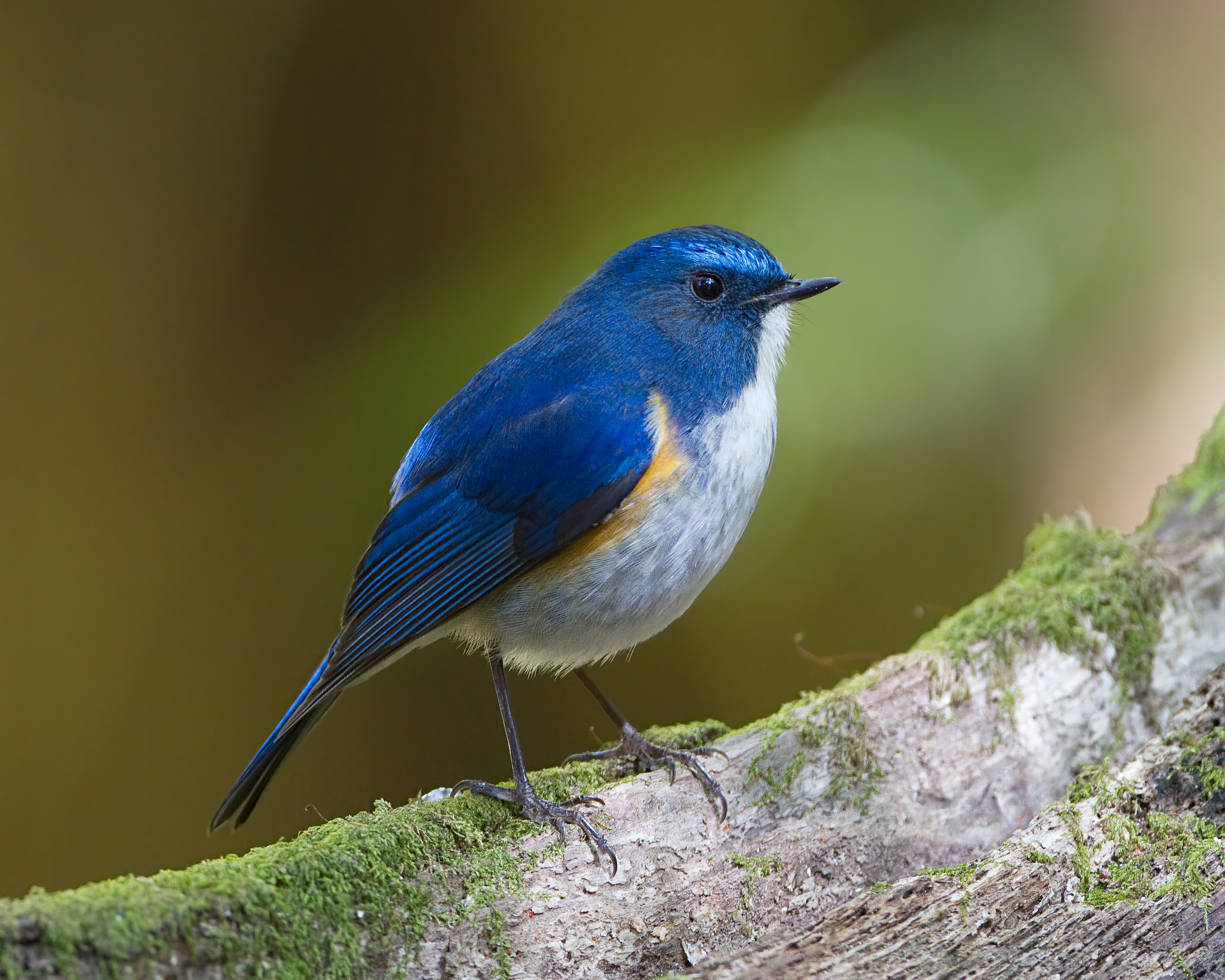
- Male at the summit of Doi Inthanon, Thailand
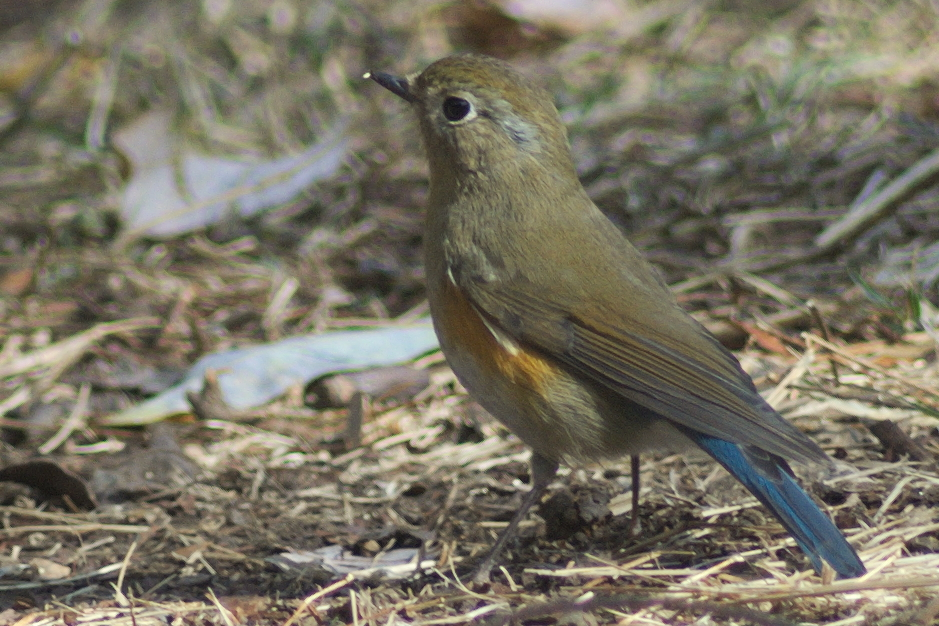
- Female in winter habitat, Sarmoli Village, Munsiari, Uttarakhand India at 2250 m altitude

Conservation status
- Least Concern (IUCN 3.1)

Scientific classification
- Kingdom: Animalia
- Phylum: Chordata
- Class: Aves
- Order: Passeriformes
- Family: Muscicapidae
- Genus: Tarsiger
- Species: T. rufilatus

Binomial name
- Tarsiger rufilatus (Hodgson, 1845)

Synonyms
- Tarsiger cyanurus rufilatus Luscinia cyanura rufilata

= Himalayan bluetail =

Species of bird

The Himalayan bluetail (Tarsiger rufilatus), also called the Himalayan red-flanked bush-robin or orange-flanked bush-robin, is a small passerine bird that was formerly classed as a member of the thrush family Turdidae, but is now more generally considered to be an Old World flycatcher of Muscicapidae.

It is closely related to the red-flanked bluetail and was generally treated as a subspecies of it in the past, but as well as differing in its migratory behaviour (the red-flanked bluetail is a long-distance migrant), it also differs in the more intense blue colour of the adult males and the greyer colour of the females and juveniles.

== Description and distribution ==
The Himalayan bluetail is a short-distance altitudinal migrant species, breeding in the Himalaya in bush layer (dwarf rhododendron in wetter areas, deciduous bushes in drier) of conifer and mixed conifer-oak forest, main species fir (Abies) but sometimes in areas with Picea smithiana or Pinus wallichiana/Cupressus torulosa forest; at 3000–4400 m, not penetrating beyond tree-line and in winters found at 1,500–2,500 m typically in broadleaf evergreen forest, dense dark undergrowth and thickets, clearings, treefall gaps with vine tangles, open woodland; commonly seen along tracks; favours ridges and mountain tops. It is insectivorous.
