= An Annotated Checklist of the Birds of the Oriental Region =

Book by Tim Inskipp, Nigel Lindsey and Will Duckworth

- Author: Tim Inskipp, Nigel Lindsey and Will Duckworth
- Cover artist: Carl d'Silva
- Language: English
- Publisher: Oriental Bird Club
- Publication date: 1996
- Publication place: United Kingdom
- Media type: Print (Softback)
- Pages: 294
- ISBN: 0-9529545-0-8
- OCLC: 36261422

An Annotated Checklist of the Birds of the Oriental Region is a 1996 softback book published by the Oriental Bird Club, and authored by Tim Inskipp, Nigel Lindsey and Will Duckworth.

It contains a list of all 2,586 species recorded in the Oriental Bird Club's areas of operation up to the date of publication. This area approximates to that covered by the Oriental zoogeographical region, with the exception that for countries such as China and Pakistan which straddle the Oriental / Palaearctic boundary, the whole country is included; those species which do not occur within the Oriental region, are however indicated, so the book also serves as a list for the zoogeographical region. Prior to the publication of this work, no such publication existed.

For its higher-level taxonomy, the book uses the Sibley–Ahlquist classification, but for species-level taxonomic decisions, the authors reviewed individual cases themselves, explaining the reasons for their decisions in annotations against the species' entry.

Its cover is green in colour, and it is illustrated by a painting of a Sultan tit (Melanochlora sultanea) by Carl d'Silva. The book has 294 pages comprising an 18-page introduction, which includes a discussion of the rationale behind the choice of English names, the systematic list (195 pages), a 17-page references list containing 814 items, and indexes of both English and scientific names. There is also a map of the region covered (supplementing the textual description within the introduction), and a list of eight excluded species.

Works which used this work for their taxonomic basis include:

- Birds of the Indian Subcontinent, by Richard Grimmett, Carol Inskipp, and Tim Inskipp
- A Guide to the Birds of South-East Asia, by Craig Robson

== Reviews ==
Reviews of the checklist can be found in the following:

- van Rootselaar, Oscar (1997) Birding World 10(3):119
