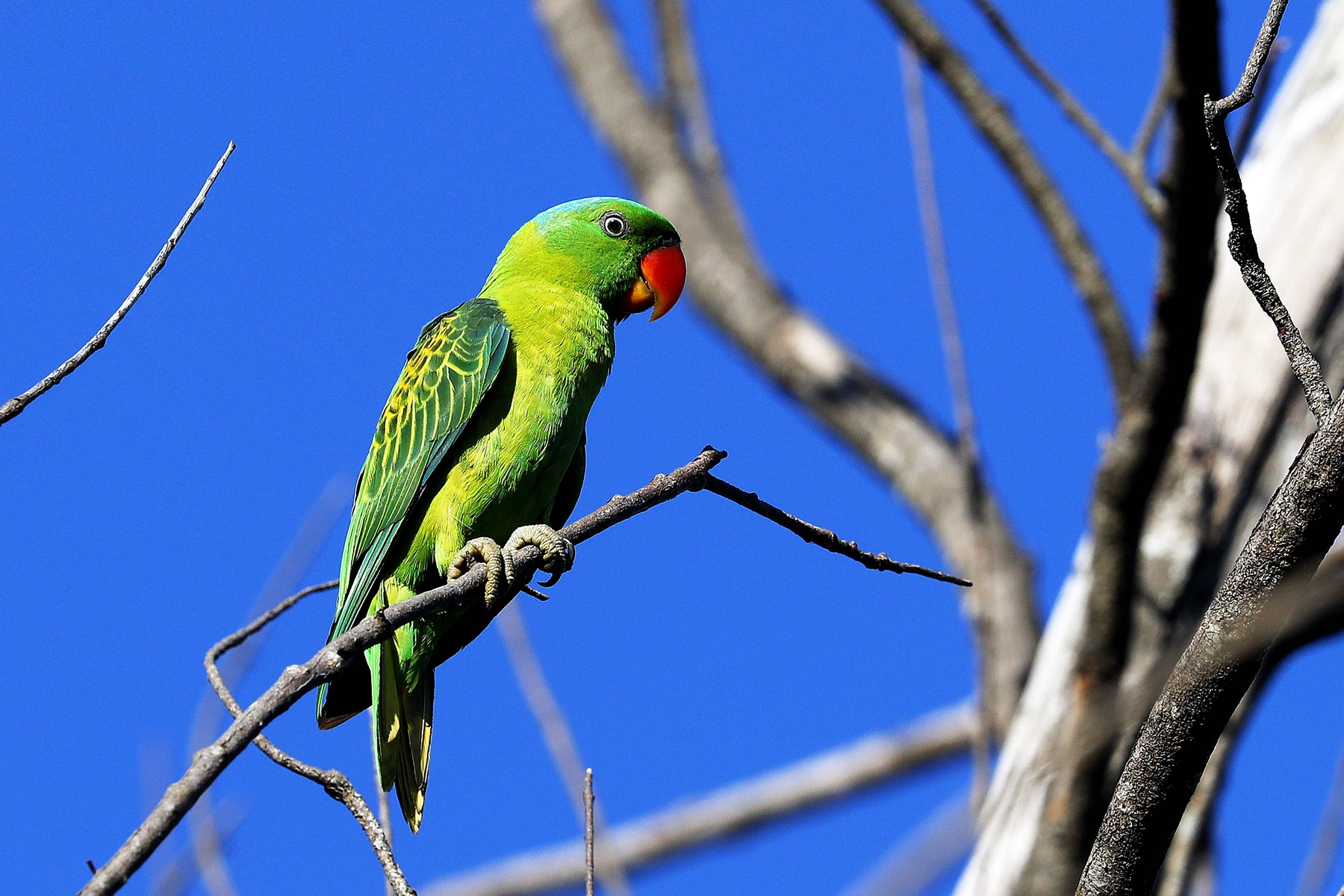
- ssp. talautensis from the introduced population in Kota Kinabalu

Conservation status
- Near Threatened (IUCN 3.1)

Scientific classification
- Kingdom: Animalia
- Phylum: Chordata
- Class: Aves
- Order: Psittaciformes
- Family: Psittaculidae
- Genus: Tanygnathus
- Species: T. lucionensis

Binomial name
- Tanygnathus lucionensis (Linnaeus, 1766)

Synonyms
- Psittacus lucionensis Linnaeus, 1766

= Blue-naped parrot =

Species of bird

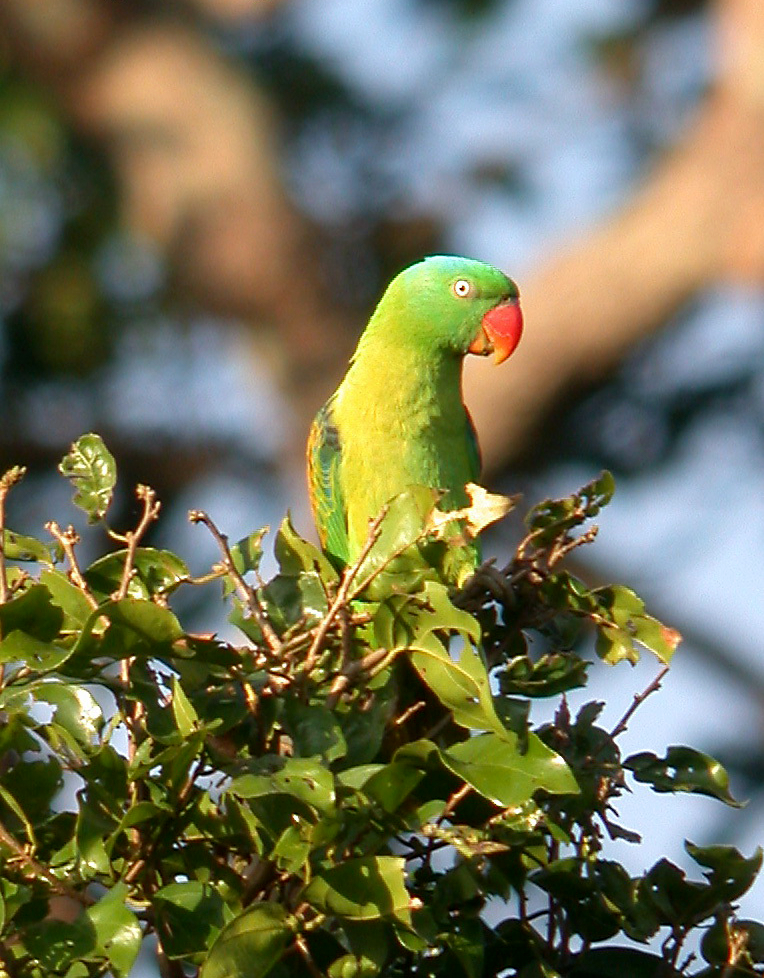
ssp. lucionensis in Luzon

The blue-naped parrot (Tanygnathus lucionensis), also known as the blue-crowned green parrot, Luzon parrot, the Philippine green parrot, and locally known as pikoy, is a parrot native throughout the Philippines and the Talaud Islands of Indonesia. It is threatened by habitat loss and trapping for the pet trade. It is illegal to hunt, capture or possess Blue-naped parrots under Philippine Law RA 9147.

== Description ==
This is a medium size parrot, around 31 cm (12 in) in length, primarily green except for a light blue rear crown and nape, pale blue lower back and rump, scalloped shoulders with orange-brown on black coverts, and blackish underwings with green underwing coverts.

== Taxonomy ==
In 1760 the French zoologist Mathurin Jacques Brisson included a description of the blue-naped parrot in his Ornithologie based on a specimen collected on the island of Luzon in the Philippines. He used the French name Le perroquet de l'Isle de Luçon and the Latin name Psittacus lucionensis. Although Brisson coined Latin names, these do not conform to the binomial system and are not recognised by the International Commission on Zoological Nomenclature. When in 1766 the Swedish naturalist Carl Linnaeus updated his Systema Naturae for the twelfth edition he added 240 species that had been previously described by Brisson. One of these was the blue-naped parrot. Linnaeus included a terse description, used the binomial name Psittacus lucionensis and cited Brisson's work. The specific name lucionensis is from Luzon in the Philippines. This species is now placed in the genus Tanygnathus which was introduced by the German naturalist Johann Wagler in 1832.

There are four subspecies:

- T. l. lucionensis: Luzon and Mindoro, Philippines
- T. l. hybridus: Polillo Islands, Philippines. Blue on crown less extensive, tinged with violet. More green on wing coverts.
- T. l. salvadorii: Visayas, Palawan, Mindanao, Sulu Archipelago and the norhernmost islands near Borneo; all green back
- T. l. talautensis: Talaud Islands (Indonesia); all green back but blue on head extends into the cheeks

== Distribution and ecology ==
The species is widespread throughout the Philippines. Three subspecies are endemic to the Philippines: T. l. lucionensis (Luzon and Mindoro), T. l. hybridus (Polillo Islands), and T. l. salvadorii (southern Philippines, including the Sulu Archipelago). The last subspecies, T. l . talautensis, is native to the Visayas and Mindanao island groups of the Philippines, with a range extending to the Talaud Islands of Indonesia.

T. l. salvadorii and T. l . talautensis have also been introduced to the Sangihe Islands, the islands off northern Sabah in Malaysia, and within the mainland of Borneo itself (e.g. Kota Kinabalu).

It is found in secondary forest, at forest edges and in plantations at elevations of up to 1000 m. Flock size is usually under a dozen. The blue-naped parrot feeds on mangoes, berries, seeds, nuts and grains. It nests in tree holes.

== Conservation ==
The International Union for Conservation of Nature has assessed this bird as near threatened with the population continuing to decrease. It estimates that there are 1,500 to 7,000 mature individuals left. It has been extirpated across most of its range in Negros and Siquijor. Habitat loss and trapping have made this species scarce on most islands except Mindoro and Palawan. The Katala Foundation has raised concerns over the increasing illegal trade of this bird on Palawan.

Starting 2010, this species is depicted in the Philippine five hundred-peso note although it is incorrectly drawn with a peach colored beak.

It occurs in a few protected areas like Bataan National Park, Quezon Protected Landscape and Puerto Princesa Subterranean River National Park but while protected on paper, protection is lax and deforestation and trapping continue within these areas.

== Gallery ==
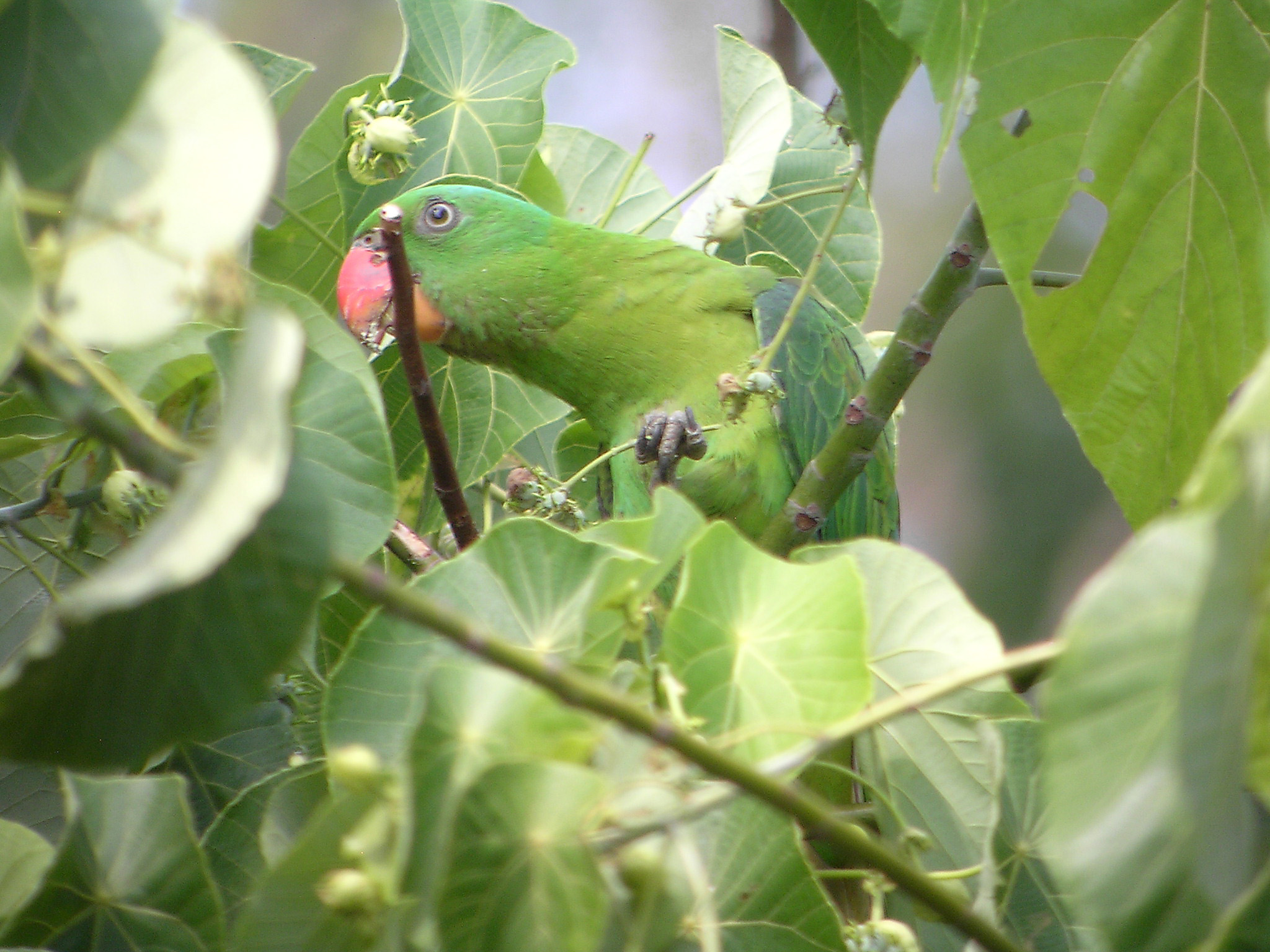
In Luzon, the Philippines

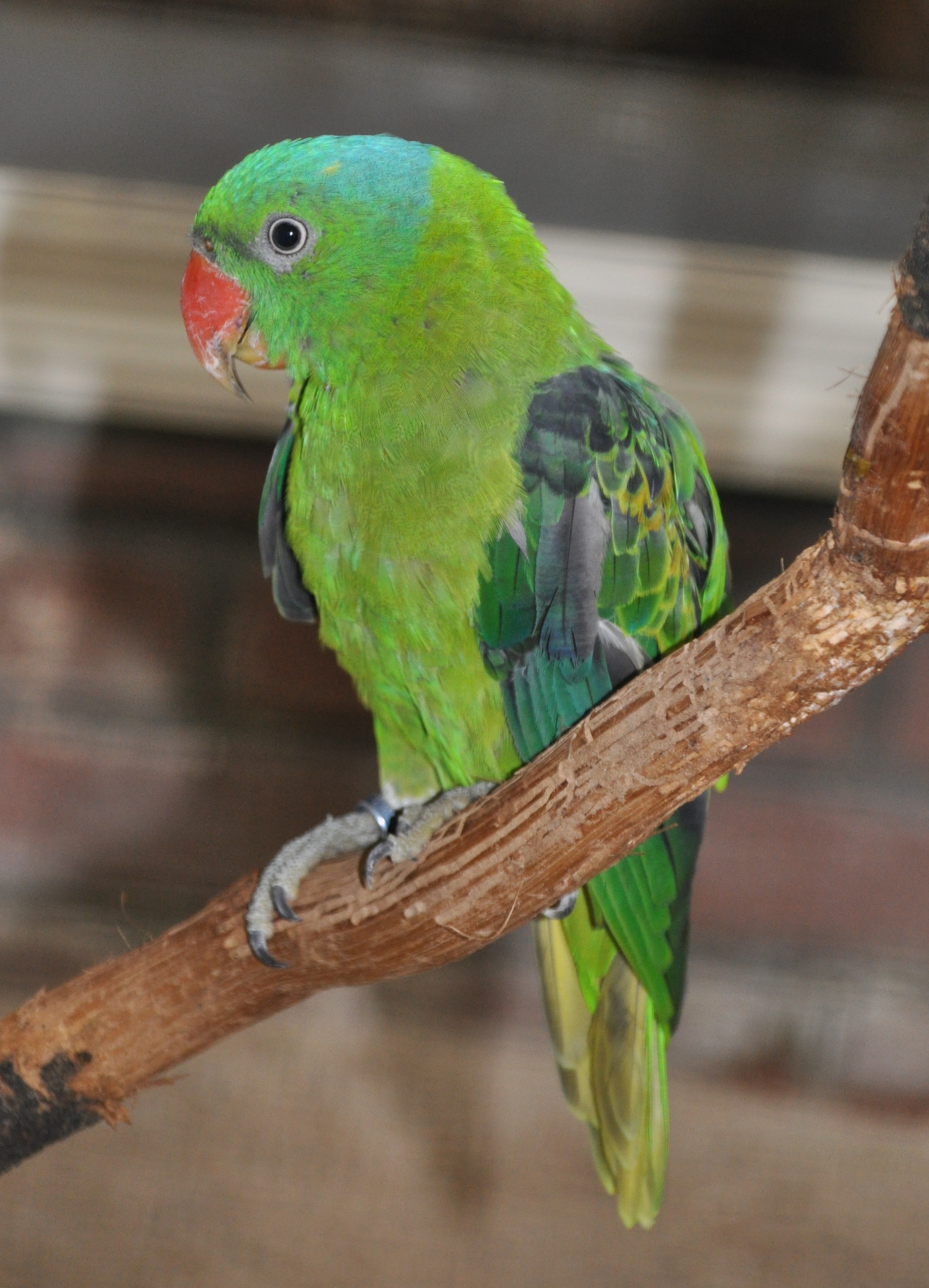
At Walsrode Bird Park

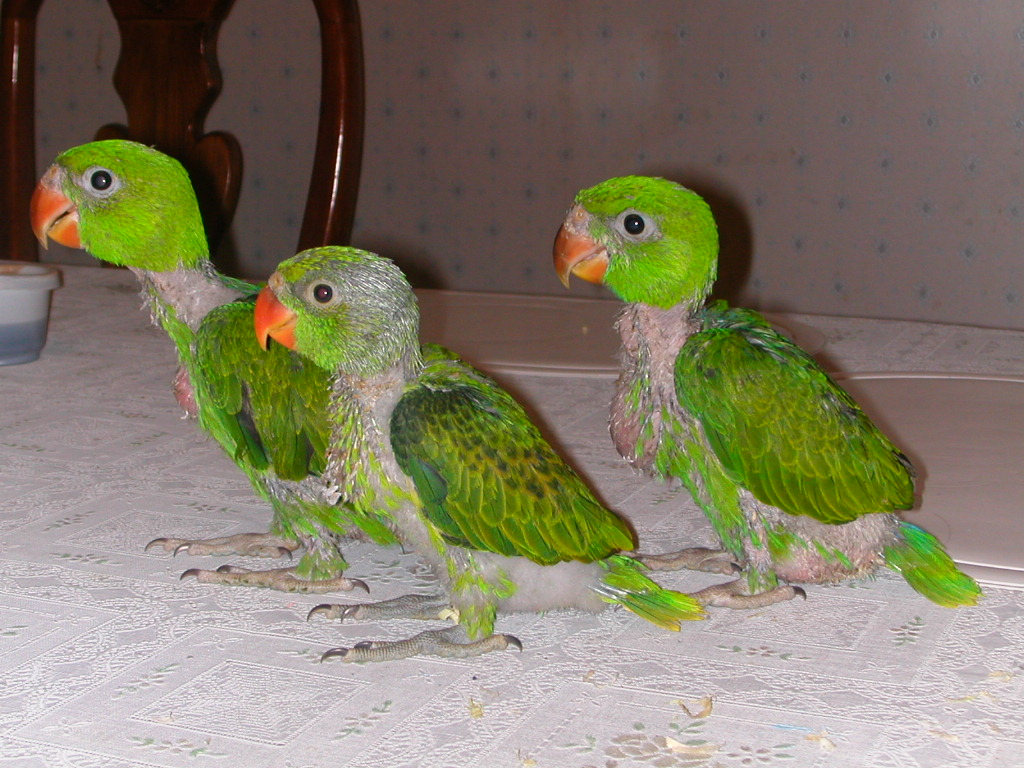
Three hand-reared chicks

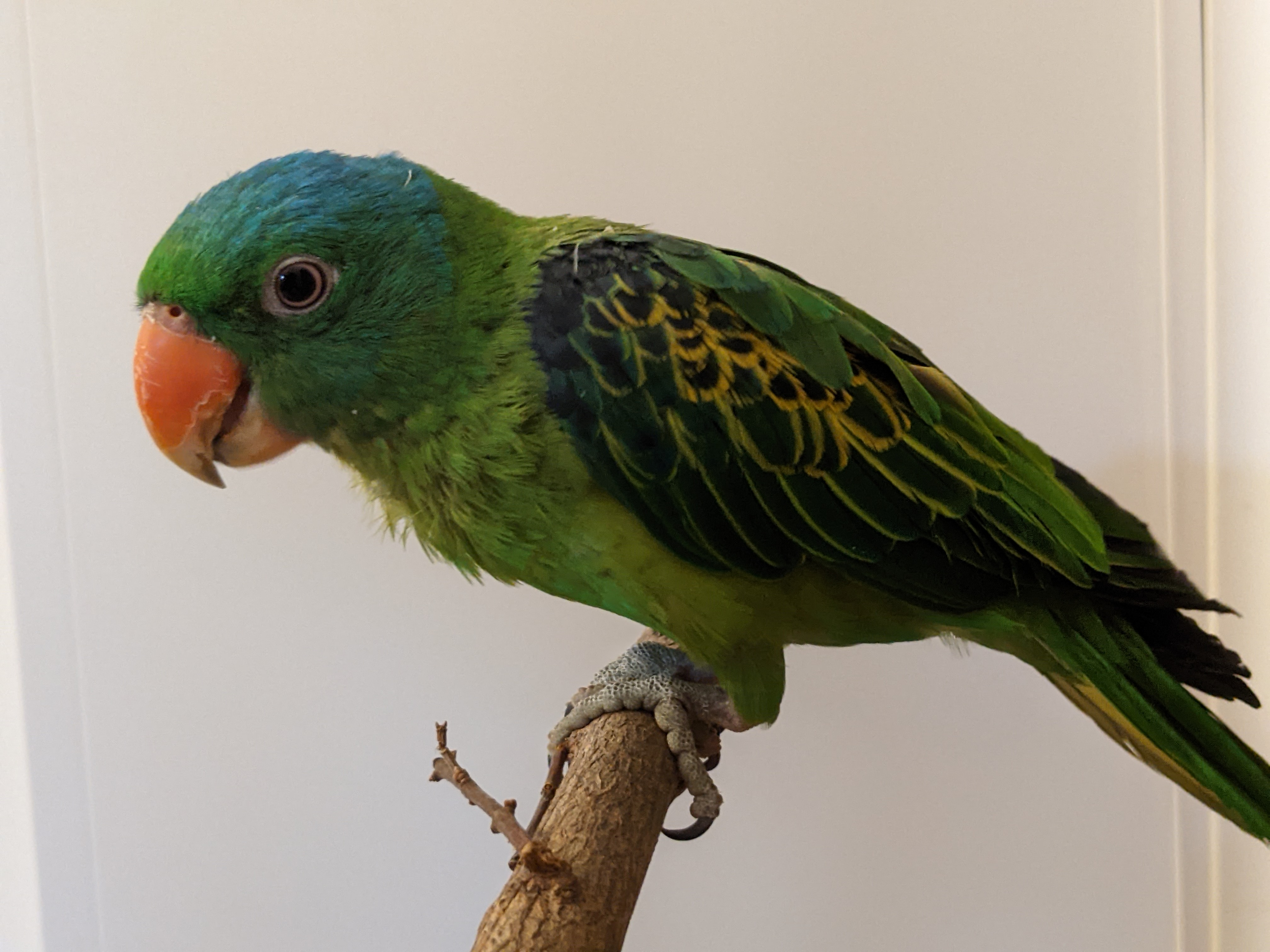
Tanygnathus lucionensis female

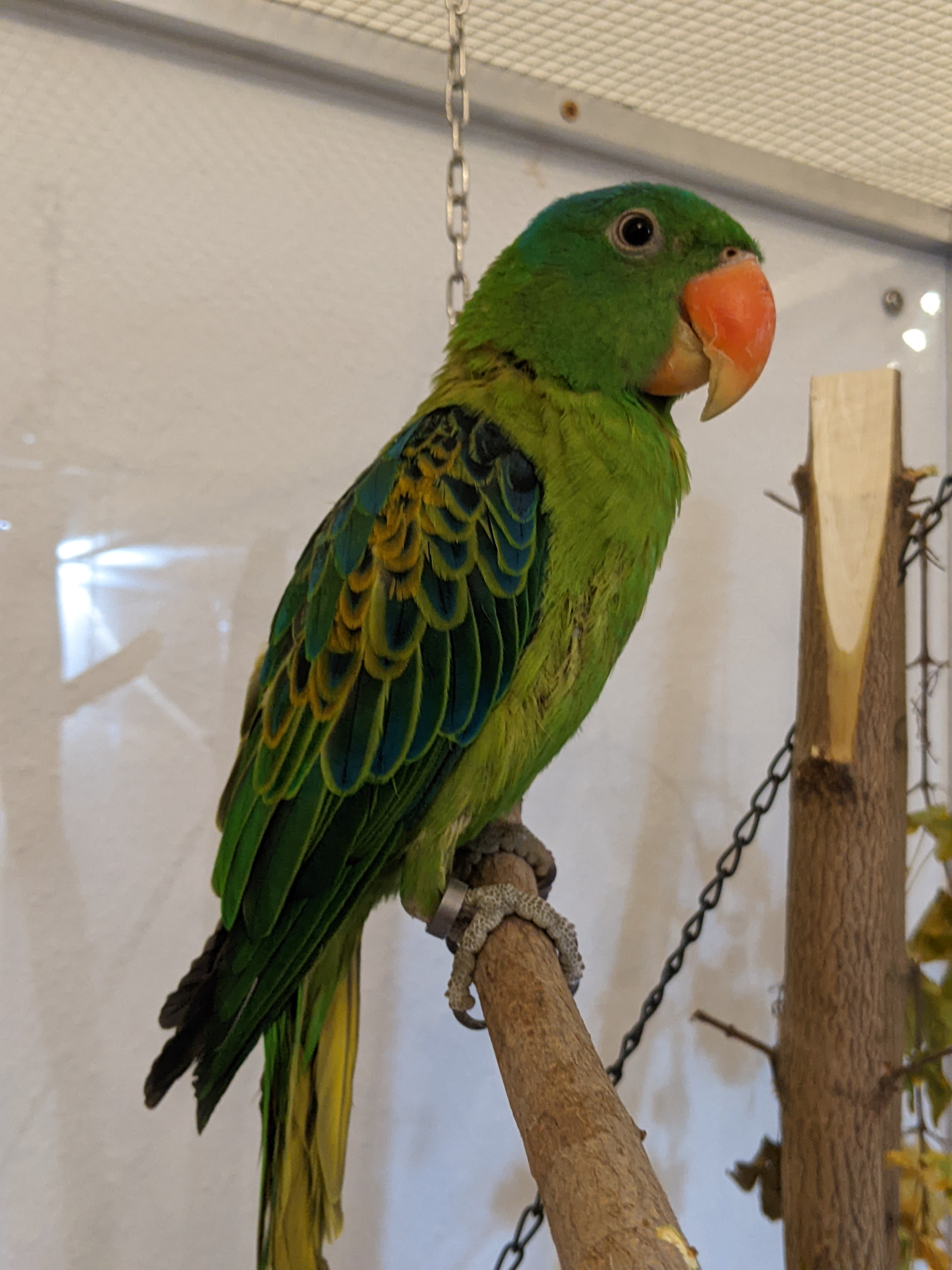
Tanygnathus lucionensis male in captivity
