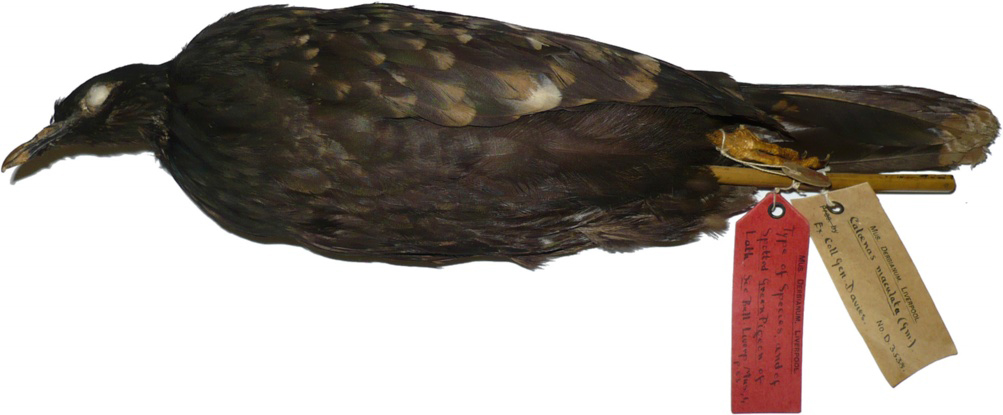
- The only specimen in existence today

Conservation status
- Extinct (1820s) (IUCN 3.1)

Scientific classification
- Kingdom: Animalia
- Phylum: Chordata
- Class: Aves
- Order: Columbiformes
- Family: Columbidae
- Genus: Caloenas
- Species: †C. maculata

Binomial name
- †Caloenas maculata (Gmelin, 1789)

Synonyms
- Columba maculata Gmelin, 1789

= Spotted green pigeon =

Extinct species of bird

The spotted green pigeon or Liverpool pigeon (Caloenas maculata) is a species of pigeon which is most likely extinct. It was first mentioned and described in 1783 by John Latham, who had seen two specimens of unknown provenance and a drawing depicting the bird. The taxonomic relationships of the bird were long obscure, and early writers suggested many different possibilities, though the idea that it was related to the Nicobar pigeon (C. nicobarica) prevailed, and it was therefore placed in the same genus, Caloenas. Today, the species is only known from a specimen kept in World Museum, Liverpool. Overlooked for much of the 20th century, it was recognised as a valid extinct species by the IUCN Red List only in 2008. It may have been native to an island somewhere in the South Pacific Ocean or the Indian Ocean, and it has been suggested that a bird referred to as titi by Tahitian islanders was this bird. In 2014, a genetic study confirmed it as a distinct species related to the Nicobar pigeon, and showed that the two were the closest relatives of the extinct dodo and Rodrigues solitaire.

The surviving specimen is 32 cm (13 in) long, and has very dark, brownish plumage with a green gloss. The neck feathers are elongated, and most of the feathers on the upperparts and wings have a yellowish spot on their tips. It has a black bill with a yellow tip, and the end of the tail has a pale band. It has relatively short legs and long wings. It has been suggested it had a knob on its bill, but there is no evidence for this. Unlike the Nicobar pigeon, which is mainly terrestrial, the physical features of the spotted green pigeon suggest it was mainly arboreal, and fed on fruit. The spotted green pigeon may have been close to extinction by the time Europeans arrived in its native area, and may have disappeared due to over-hunting and predation by introduced animals around the 1820s.

== Taxonomy ==
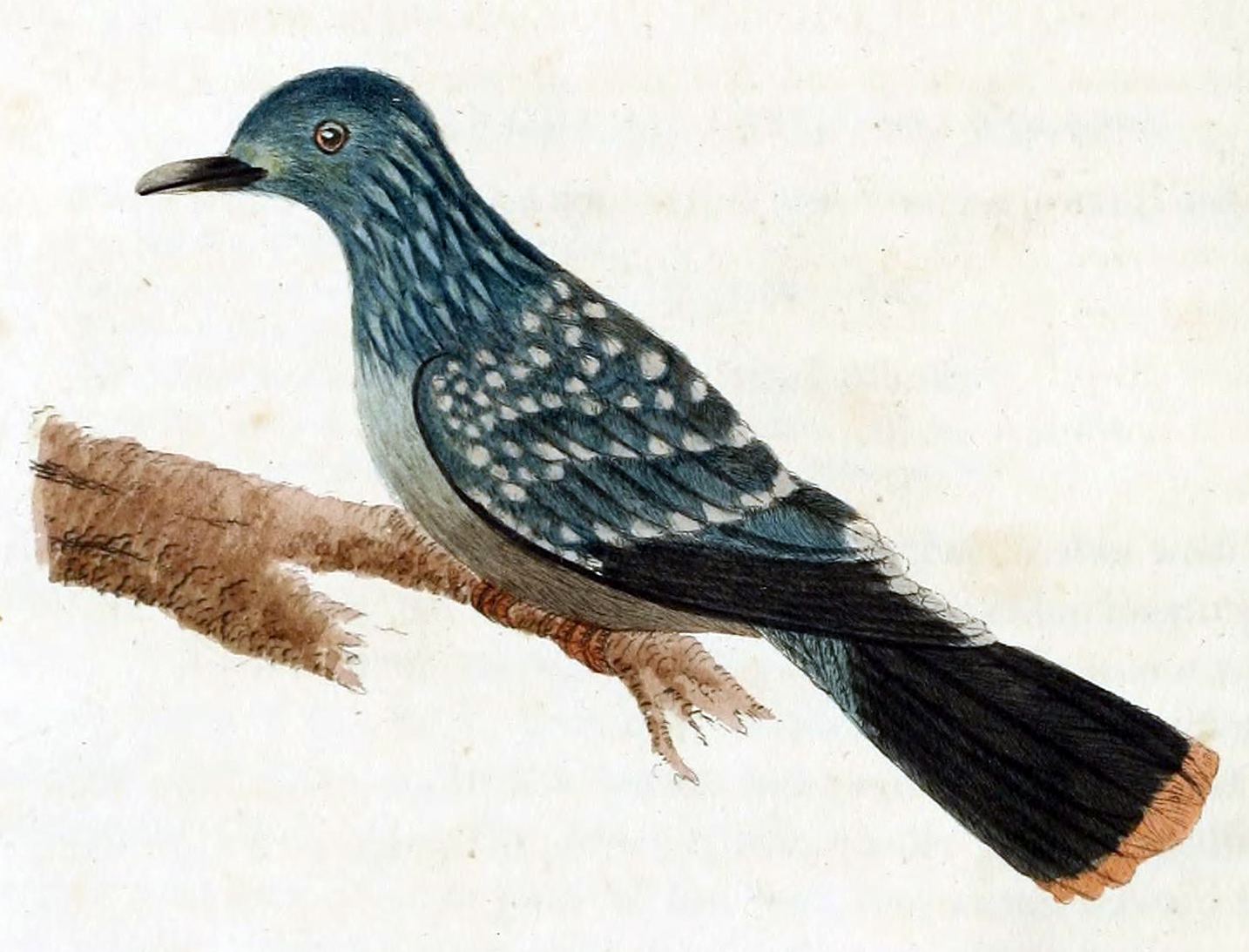
Illustration by John Latham, from A General History of Birds, 1823

The spotted green pigeon was first mentioned and described by the English ornithologist John Latham in his 1783 work A General Synopsis of Birds. Latham stated that he had seen two specimens, in the collections of the English major Thomas Davies and the naturalist Joseph Banks, but it is uncertain how these ended up in the respective collections, and their provenance is unknown. Though Banks received many specimens from the British explorer James Cook, and Davies received specimens from contacts in New South Wales, implying a location in the South Pacific Ocean, there are no records of spotted green pigeons having been sent from these sources. After Davies' death, his specimen was bought in 1812 by Edward Smith-Stanley, 13th Earl of Derby, who kept it in Knowsley Hall. Smith-Stanley's collection was transferred to the Derby Museum in 1851, where the specimen was prepared from the original posed mount (which had perhaps been taxidermied by Davies himself) into a study skin. This museum later became the World Museum, where the specimen is housed today, but Banks' specimen is now lost. Latham also mentioned a drawing of a spotted green pigeon in the collection of the British antiquarian Ashton Lever, but it is unknown which specimen this was based on; it could have been either, or a third individual. Latham included an illustration of the spotted green pigeon in his 1823 work A General History of Birds, and though the basis for his illustration is unknown, it differs from Davies' specimen in some details. It is possible that it was based on the drawing in the Leverian collection, since Latham stated that this drawing showed the end of the tail as "deep ferruginous" (rust-coloured), a feature also depicted in his own illustration.

The spotted green pigeon was scientifically named by the German naturalist Johann Friedrich Gmelin in 1789, based on Latham's description. The original binomial name Columba maculata means "spotted pigeon" in Latin. Latham himself accepted this name, and used it in his 1790 work Index ornithologicus. Since Latham appears to have based his 1783 description on Davies' specimen, this can therefore be considered the holotype specimen of the species. Subsequent writers were uncertain about the validity and relationships of the species; the English naturalist James Francis Stephens suggested that it belonged in the fruit pigeon genus Ptilinopus in 1826, and the German ornithologist Johann Georg Wagler instead suggested that it was a juvenile Nicobar pigeon (Caloenas nicobarica) in 1827. The Italian zoologist Tommaso Salvadori listed the bird in an appendix about "doubtful species of pigeons, which have not yet been identified" in 1893. In 1898, the Scottish ornithologist Henry Ogg Forbes supported the validity of the species, after examining Nicobar pigeon specimens and concluding that none resembled the spotted green pigeon at any stage of development. He therefore considered it a distinct species of the same genus as the Nicobar pigeon, Caloenas. In 1901, the British zoologist Walter Rothschild and the German ornithologist Ernst Hartert agreed that the pigeon belonged to Caloenas, but suggested that it was probably an "abnormity", though more than one specimen had been recorded.

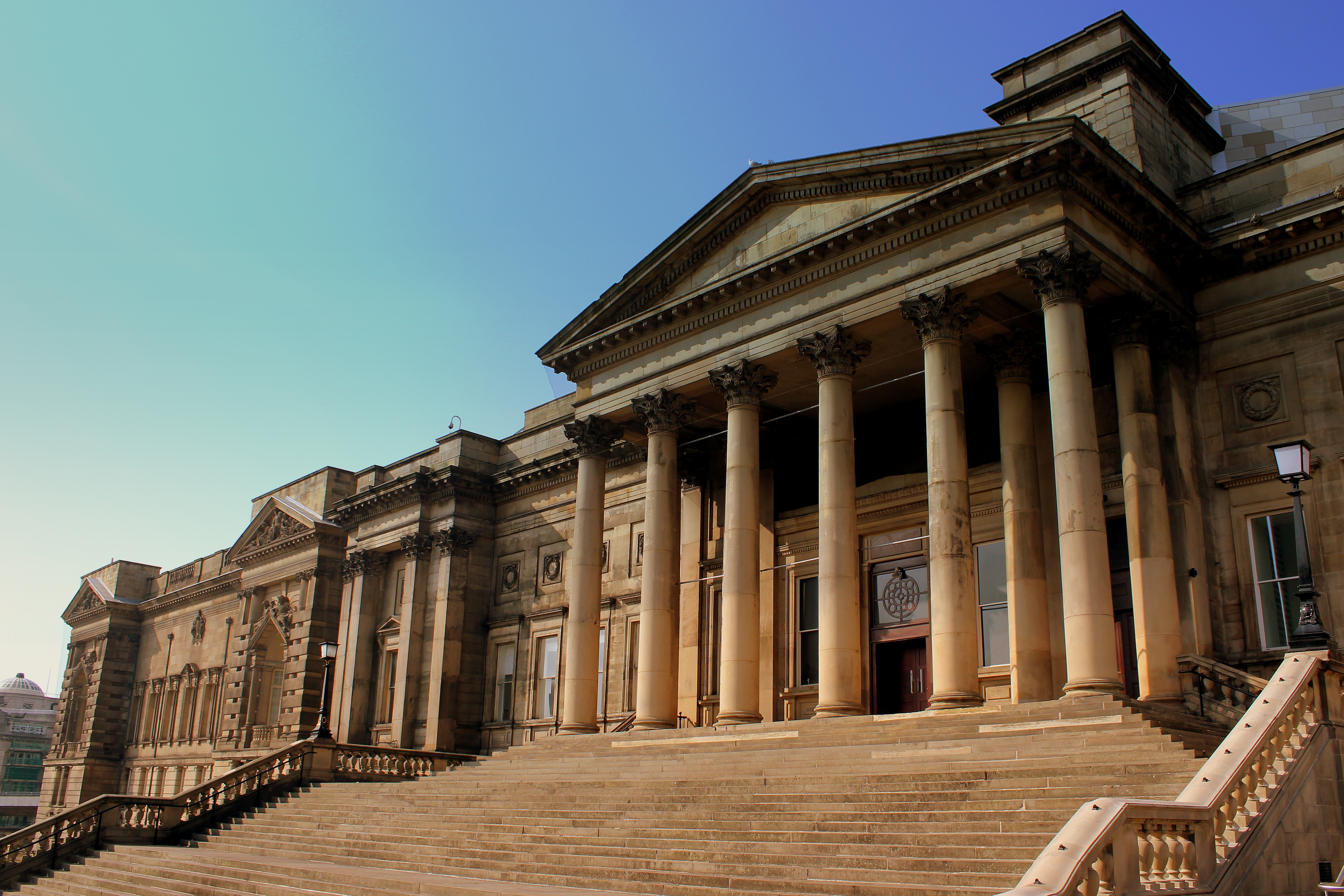
World Museum in Liverpool, where the only specimen is kept

The spotted green pigeon was only sporadically mentioned in the literature throughout the 20th century; little new information was published, and the bird remained an enigma. In 2001, the English writer Errol Fuller suggested that the bird had been historically overlooked because Rothschild (an avid collector of rare birds) dismissed it as an aberration, perhaps because he did not own the surviving specimen himself. Fuller considered it a valid, extinct species, and also coined an alternative common name for the bird: the Liverpool pigeon. On the basis of Fuller's endorsement, BirdLife International listed the spotted green pigeon as "Extinct" on the IUCN Red List in 2008; it was previously "Not Recognized". In 2001, the British ornithologist David Gibbs stated that the spotted green pigeon was only superficially similar to the Nicobar pigeon, and possibly distinct enough to warrant its own genus (related to Ptilinopus, Ducula, or Gymnophaps). He also hypothesised that the bird might have inhabited a Pacific island, based on stories told by Tahitian islanders to the Tahitian scholar Teuira Henry in 1928 about a green and white speckled bird called titi. The American palaeontologist David Steadman disputed the latter claim in a book review, noting that titi is an onomatopoeic word (resembling the sound of the bird) used especially for shearwaters (members of Procellariidae) in east Polynesia. The English ornithologists Julian P. Hume and Michael Walters, writing in 2012, agreed with Gibbs that the bird warranted generic status.

In 2020, after examining historical texts to clarify the origin and extinction date of the spotted green pigeon, the French ornithologist Philippe Raust pointed out that the information in Henry's 1928 book Ancient Tahiti was not gathered by her, but by her grandfather, the English reverend John Muggridge Orsmond, who collected ancient Tahitian traditions during the first half of the 19th century. The book devotes several pages to birds of Tahiti and its surroundings, including extinct ones, and the entry that Gibbs had linked to the spotted green pigeon reads: "The titi, which cried "titi", now extinct in Tahiti, was speckled green and white and it was the shadow of the mountain gods". The titi was included in the paragraph relating to pigeons, which suggests it was well recognised as such, and Raust found it consistent with the spotted green pigeon. Though Steadman had dismissed the idea based on the name titi also being used for shearwaters, Raust pointed out that this name was used for a wider variety of birds with vocalisations that sound like "titi". Raust also noted that an 1851 Tahitian dictionary compiled by the Welsh reverend John Davies included the word tītīhope'ore, which was used as a synonym for the titi of Henry in a 1999 dictionary. Based on definitions in Davies' dictionary, Raust translated this name as "tītī without (a long) tail." Raust suggested this name was used to distinguish it from the long-tailed koel (Urodynamis taitensis), which is called "tītī oroveo", and which is somewhat similar to Latham's illustration of the spotted green pigeon, being dark brown with paler spots and underparts. Raust believed that the study of these texts reinforced the Tahitian origin of the spotted green pigeon, and suggested this could be confirmed if possible bones of this species were one day found on Tahiti and analysed for DNA. So far, few paleontological sites on Tahiti have been studied, and fossils found there have not yet revealed unknown species.

The only specimen is today catalogued as NML-VZ D3538 at World Museum, Liverpool, where it is locked under environmentally-controlled conditions outside public view. It is kept in a cabinet in the museum's basement with other particularly important bird specimens, such as other extinct birds and type specimens. The store room is monitored for pests, and the temperature and humidity is kept stable to avoid infestations and damp. The specimen is handled with gloves when examined by researchers, and exposure to light is limited.

=== Evolution ===
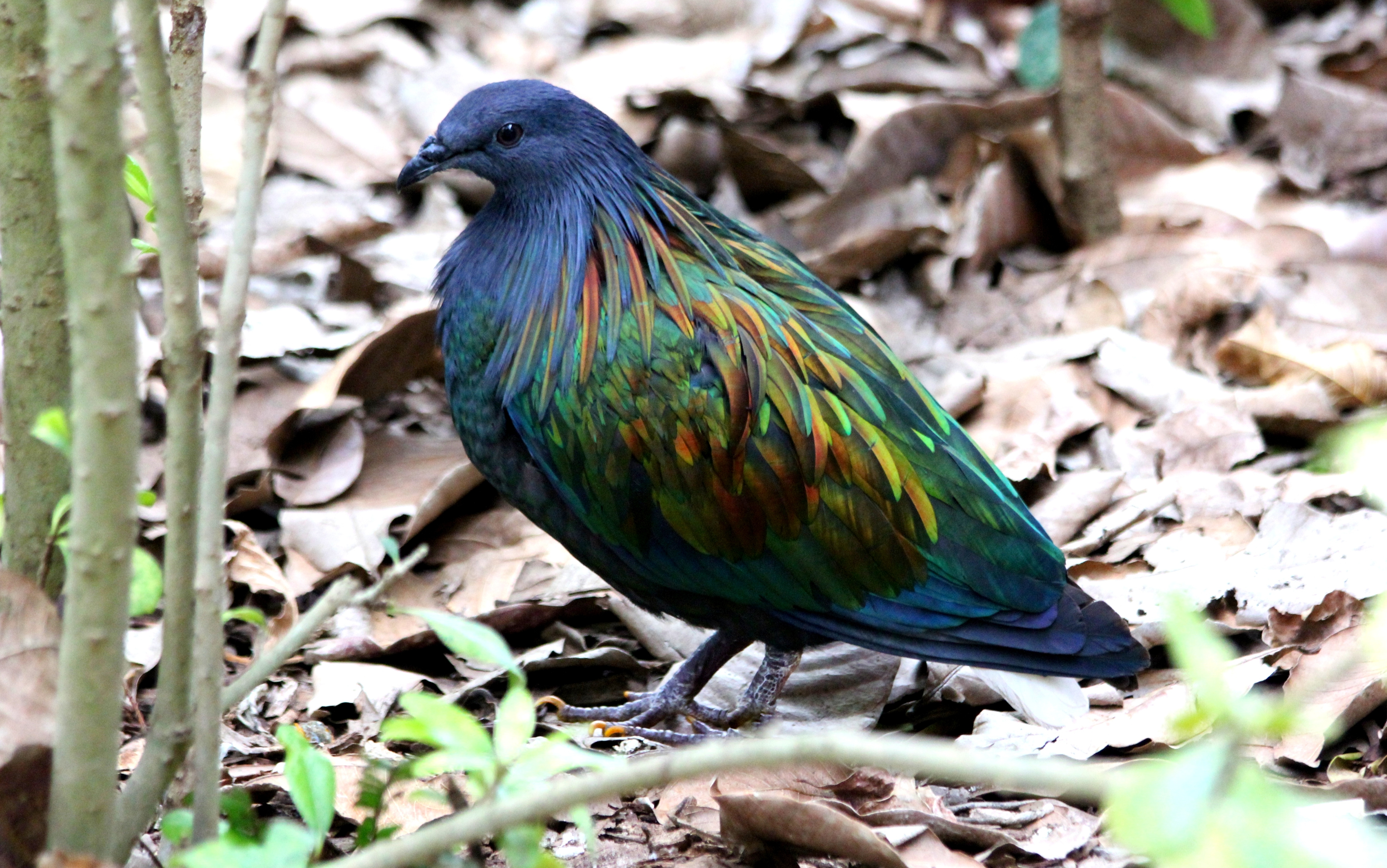
The Nicobar pigeon belongs to the same genus, and is mainly terrestrial.

In 2014, an ancient DNA analysis by the geneticist Tim H. Heupink and colleagues compared the genes of the only spotted green pigeon specimen with that of other pigeons, based on samples extracted from two of its feathers. One of the resulting phylogenetic trees (or cladograms) is shown below:

- - - Didunculus strigirostris (Tooth-billed pigeon)
    - Goura
      - Goura victoria (Victoria crowned pigeon)
      - Goura cristata (Western crowned pigeon)
  - - Raphinae
      - Raphus cucullatus (Dodo)
      - Pezophaps solitarius (Rodrigues solitaire)
    - Caloenas
      - Caloenas maculata (Spotted green pigeon)
      - Caloenas nicobarica (Nicobar pigeon)

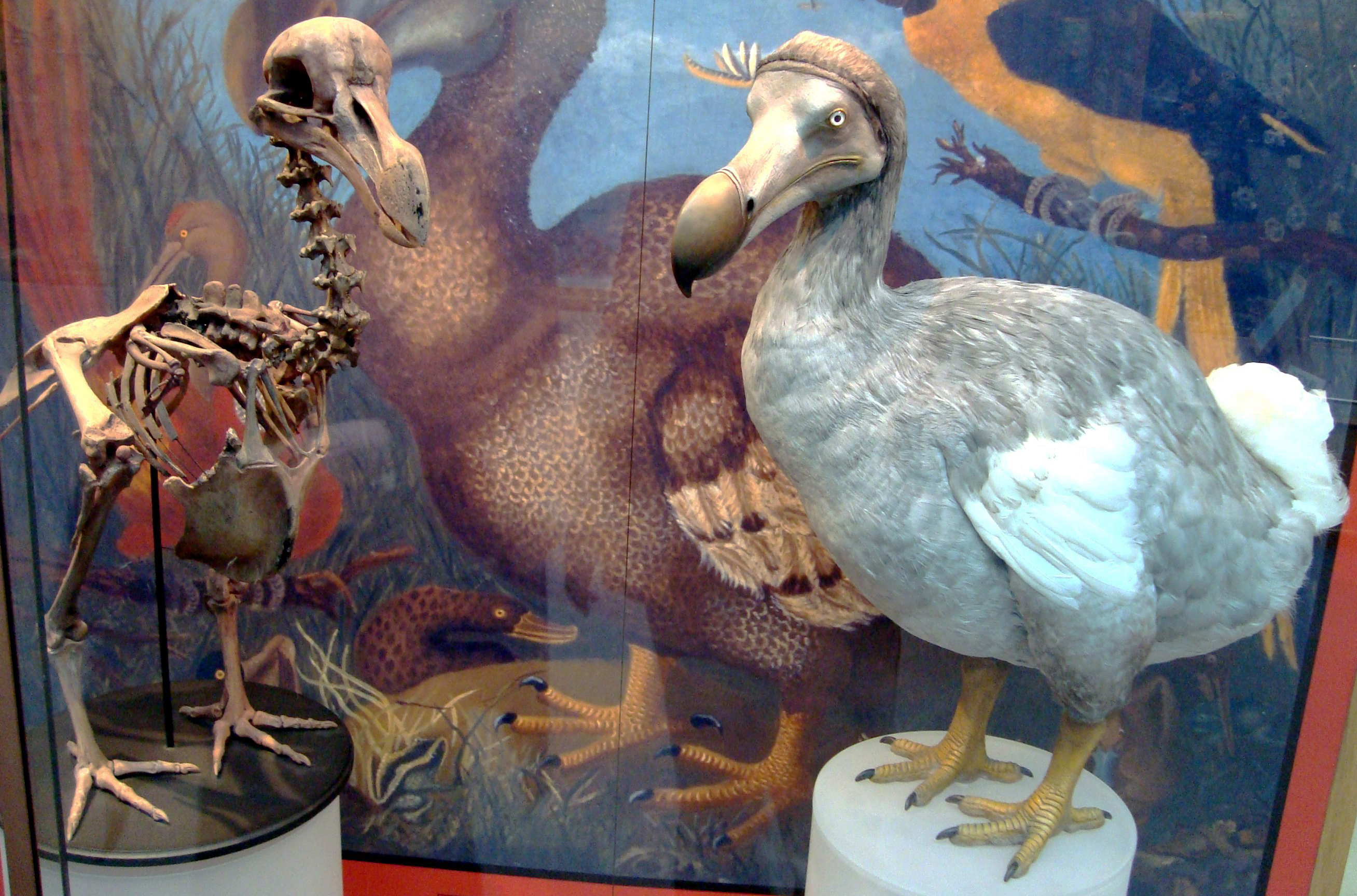
Raphines, such as the dodo, are the closest relatives of the genus Caloenas.

The spotted green pigeon was shown to be closest to the Nicobar pigeon. The genetic distance between the two was more than is seen within other pigeon species, but similar to the distance between different species within the same genus. This confirmed that the two were distinct species in the same genus, and that the spotted green pigeon was a unique, extinct taxon. The genus Caloenas was placed in a wider clade in which most members showed a mixture of arboreal (tree-dwelling) and terrestrial (ground-dwelling) traits. That Caloenas was placed in such a morphologically diverse clade may explain why many different relationships have previously been proposed for the members of the genus. A third species in the genus Caloenas, the Kanaka pigeon (C. canacorum), is only known from subfossils discovered in New Caledonia and Tonga. This species was larger than the two other members of the genus, so it is unlikely that it represents the same species as the spotted green pigeon. The possibility that the spotted green pigeon was a hybrid between other species can also be disregarded based on the genetic results. The genetic findings were confirmed by a 2016 study by the geneticist André E. R. Soares and colleagues, which managed to assemble complete mitochondrial genomes from eleven pigeon species, including the spotted green pigeon.

The distribution of the Nicobar pigeon and the Kanaka pigeon (which does not appear to have had diminished flight abilities) suggests dispersal through island hopping and an origin for the spotted green pigeon in Oceania or southeast Asia. The fact that the closest relatives of Caloenas were the extinct subfamily Raphinae (first demonstrated in a 2002 study), which consists of the dodo from Mauritius and the Rodrigues solitaire from Rodrigues, indicates that the spotted green pigeon could also have originated somewhere in the Indian Ocean. In any case, it seems most likely that the bird inhabited an island location, like its relatives. That the Caloenas pigeons were grouped in a clade at the base of the lineage leading to Raphinae indicates that the ancestors of the flightless dodo and Rodrigues solitaire were able to fly, and reached the Mascarene Islands by island hopping from south Asia.

== Description ==
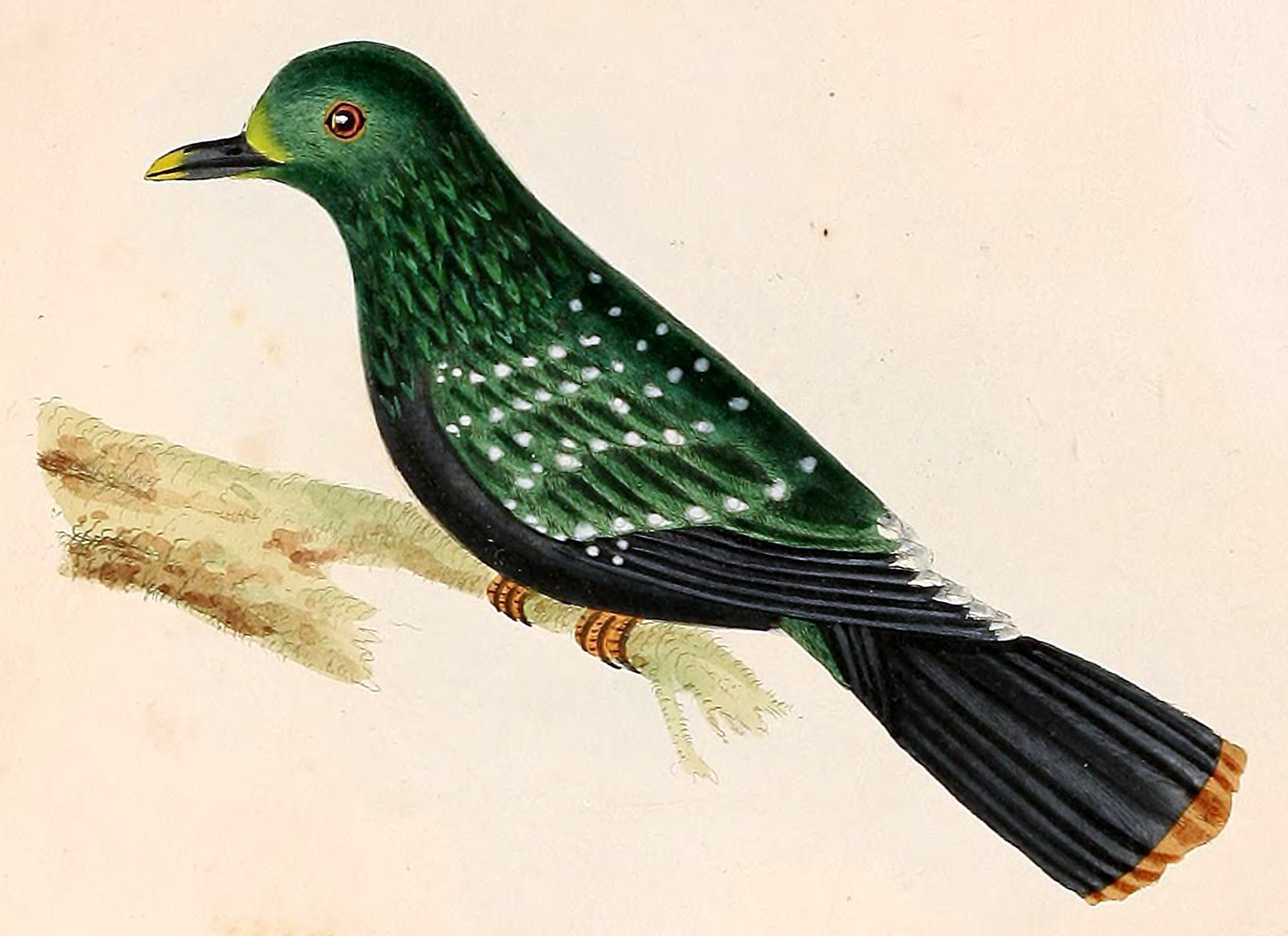
Alternate version of Latham's 1823 illustration; note the long wings.

Latham's 1823 description of the spotted green pigeon from A General History of Birds (expanded from the one in A General Synopsis of Birds) reads as follows:

Length twelve inches. Bill black, tipped with pale yellow; round the eye somewhat naked; general colour of the plumage dark green, and glossy; the head and neck are darker than the rest, and of one plain colour; the feathers of the neck long and narrow, like the hackles of a Cock; every feather of the wings and scapulars tipped with a spot of very pale cinereous white, with a point running upwards, somewhat triangular: quills and tail black; the feathers of the first tipped with cinereous white, those of the last with ferruginous white, and even at the end: belly, thighs, and vent, dusky black: the legs are brown, and the shins covered half way with downy feathers; claws black. We have only seen two specimens; one in the collection of Gen. Davies, the other in possession of Sir Joseph Banks. In a drawing of one at Sir Ashton Lever's, the end of the tail is deep ferruginous.

Most literature addressing the spotted green pigeon simply repeated Latham's descriptions, adding little new information, until Gibbs published a more detailed description in 2001, followed by the museum curator Hein van Grouw in 2014. The surviving specimen measures 32 cm (12.6 in) in length, though study specimens are often stretched or compressed during taxidermy, and may therefore not reflect the length of a living bird. The weight has not been recorded. The spotted green pigeon appears to have been smaller and slenderer than the Nicobar pigeon, which reaches 40 cm (15.7 in), and the Kanaka pigeon appears to have been 25% larger than the latter. At 126 mm (5 in) in length, the tail is longer than that of the Nicobar pigeon, but the head is smaller in relation. The bill is 20 mm (0.8 in), and the tarsus measures 33 mm (1.3 in). Though the wings of the specimen appear to be short and rounded, and have been described as being 175 mm (6.9 in) long, van Grouw discovered that the five outer primary feathers have been pulled out of each wing, and suggested that the wings would therefore had been about 50 mm (2 in) longer in life, around 225 mm (9 in) in total. This is in accordance with Latham's 1823 illustration, which shows a bird with longer wings.

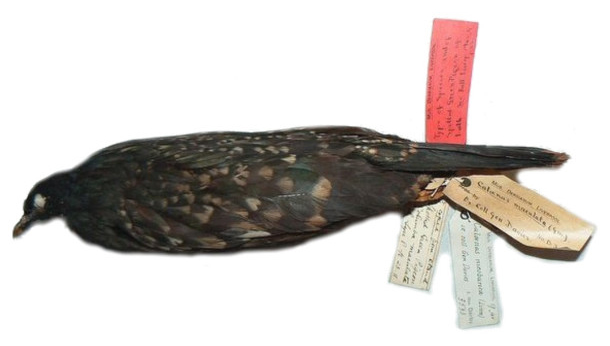
Side view of the only specimen

The bill of the specimen is black with a yellowish tip, and the cere is also black, with feathers on the upper side, almost to the nostrils. The lores are naked, and the upper part of the head is sooty black. The rest of the head is mostly brownish-black. The feathers of the nape and the neck are slightly bifurcated and have a dark green gloss, the latter with coppery reflections. The feathers of the neck are elongated (sometimes referred to as hackles), and some of those on the sides and lower part have paler spots near the tips. Most of the feathers on the upperparts and wings are dark brown or brownish-black with a dark green gloss. Almost all of these feathers have a triangular, yellowish-buff spot at their tips. The spots are almost whitish on some of the scapular feathers, vague and dark on the primary feathers. The underside of the wings is black with browner flight feathers, which have a pale spot or band at the tips. The breast is brownish-black with a faint green sheen. The tail is blackish with a dark green sheen, brownish-black on the underside, with a narrow, cinnamon-coloured band at the end. This differs from the rust-coloured tail-tip apparently shown in the drawing owned by Lever, and Latham's own illustration. The legs are small and slender, have long toes, large claws, and a comparatively short tarsus, whereas the Nicobar pigeon has shorter claws and a longer tarsus.

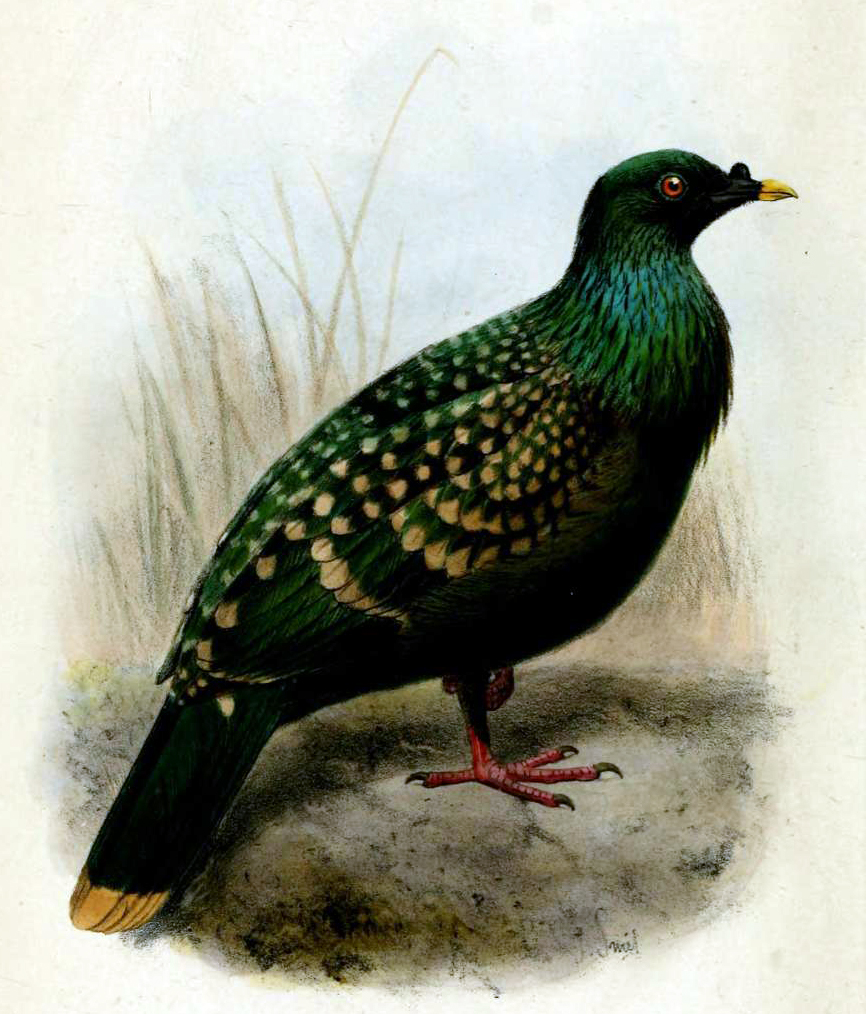
1898 illustration by Joseph Smit, incorrectly depicting the bird with a knob on its bill and legs in reverse positions

When examining the specimen, van Grouw noticed that the legs had at one point been detached and are now attached opposite their natural positions. The short feathering of the legs would therefore have been attached to the inner side of the upper tarsus in life, not the outer. The plate accompanying Forbes' 1898 article shows the feathers on the outer side, and depicts the legs as pinkish, whereas they are yellow in the skin. The spotted green pigeon has at times been described as having a knob at the base of its bill, similar to that of the Nicobar pigeon. This idea seems to have originated with Forbes, who had the bird depicted with this feature, perhaps due to his conviction that it was a species of Caloenas; it was depicted with a knob as late as 2002. This is despite the fact that the surviving specimen does not possess a knob, and Latham did not mention or depict this feature, so such depictions are probably incorrect. The artificial eyes of the specimen were removed when it was prepared into a study skin, but red paint around the right eye-socket suggests that it was originally intended to have red eyes. It is unknown whether this represents the natural eye colour of the bird, yet the eyes were also depicted as red in Latham's illustration, which does not appear to have been based on the existing specimen. Forbes had the iris depicted as orange and the skin around the eye as green, though this was probably guesswork.

The triangular spots of the spotted green pigeon are not unique among pigeons, but are also seen in the spot-winged pigeon (Columba maculosa) and the speckled pigeon (C. guinea), and are the result of lack of melanin deposition during development. The yellow-buff coloured spots are very worn, while less worn feathers have white tips; this indicates that the former were stained during life or represent a different stage of plumage, and that the latter were fresher. The plumage of the spotted green pigeon was distinct in being very soft compared to that of other pigeons, perhaps due to the body feathers being proportionally long. The hackles were not as elongated as those of the Nicobar pigeon, and the feathers did not differ from those of other pigeons in their microstructure. The plumage was also distinct in being very pigmented, except for the tips of the feathers, and even the down was dark, unlike that of most other birds (a feature otherwise seen in aberrant plumage).

Though the plumage of the spotted green pigeon resembles that of the Nicobar pigeon in some respects, it is also similar to that of species in the imperial pigeon genus Ducula. The metallic-green colouration is commonly found among them, and similar hackles can be seen in the goliath imperial pigeon (D. goliath). The Polynesian imperial pigeon (D. aurorae) has similar soft feathers, and immature individuals of this species and the Pacific imperial pigeon (D. pacifica) have plumage different from that of juvenile and adult birds until they moult. Therefore, van Grouw found it possible that the dull, brownish-black underparts of the surviving spotted green pigeon specimen represents the plumage of an immature bird, as the adults of similar birds have stronger and more glossy iridescence. He suggested that the brighter bird with paler underparts and whiter wing tips seen in Latham's illustration may represent the adult plumage.

== Behaviour and ecology ==
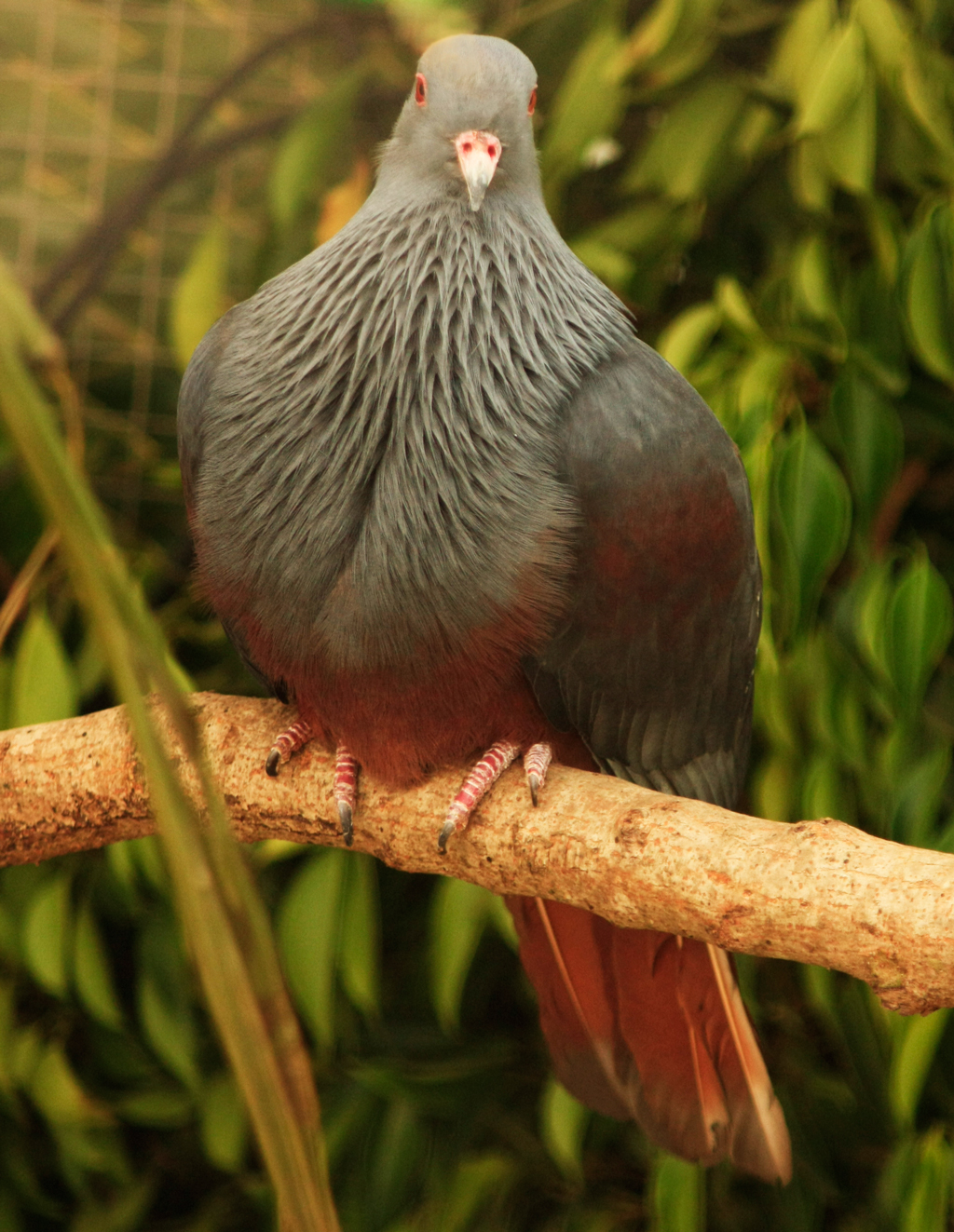
Ducula pigeons, like the goliath imperial pigeon, may be ecologically comparable.

The behaviour of the spotted green pigeon was not recorded, but theories have been proposed based on its physical features. Gibbs found the delicate, part-feathered legs and long tail indicative of at least partially arboreal habits. After noting that the wings were not short after all, van Grouw stated that the bird would not have been terrestrial, unlike the related Nicobar pigeon. He pointed out that the overall proportions and shape of the bird (longer tail, shorter legs, primary feathers probably reaching the middle of the tail) was more similar to the pigeons of the genus Ducula. It may therefore have been ecologically similar to those birds, have likewise been strongly arboreal, and kept to the dense canopy of forests. By contrast, the mainly terrestrial Nicobar pigeon forages on the forest floor. The dark eyes of the Nicobar pigeon are typical of species that forage on forest floors, whereas the coloured bill and presumably coloured eyes of the spotted green pigeon are similar to those of frugivorous (fruit-eating) pigeons. The feet of the spotted green pigeon are also similar to those of pigeons that forage in trees. The slender bill indicates that it fed on soft fruits.

Believing that the wings were short and round, Gibbs thought the bird was not a strong flyer, and therefore not nomadic (periodically moving from place to place). In spite of the evidently longer wings which might have made it a strong flyer, van Grouw also thought it would have been a sedentary (mostly staying at the same location) bird, that preferred not to fly across open water, similar to species in Ducula. It may have had a limited distribution on a small, remote island, which may explain why its provenance remains unknown. Raust pointed out that the fact that Polynesians considered the titi to emanate from mountain gods suggests that it lived in remote, high-altitude forests.

== Extinction ==
The spotted green pigeon is most likely extinct, and may already have been close to extinction by the time Europeans arrived in its native area. The species may have disappeared due to being over-hunted and being preyed upon by introduced animals. Hume suggested that the bird may have survived until the 1820s. Raust agreed that the bird's extinction occurred during the 1820s, pointing out that the entry of the titi in Henry's 1928 book was based on much older accounts.
