= Floodbrook Clough =

Woodland in Runcorn, England

- Site of Special Scientific Interest
- The Flood Brook passing through Floodbrook Clough

- Location within Cheshire
- Location of Floodbrook Clough.
- Area of search: Cheshire
- Grid reference: SJ532800
- Coordinates: 53.315°N 2.703°W
- Interest: Biological
- Area: 5.35 hectares (0.054 km^{2}; 0.021 sq mi)
- Notification date: 1979

Floodbrook Clough is an ancient woodland and site of special scientific interest which cuts through the centre of the Beechwood area of Runcorn, Cheshire, England. Located in a steep valley around the Flood Brook stream, it is one of Cheshire's best examples of clough woodland on keuper marl. It covers a total area of 5.35 hectares (13.22 acres). It is owned and managed by the Woodland Trust.

== Gallery ==
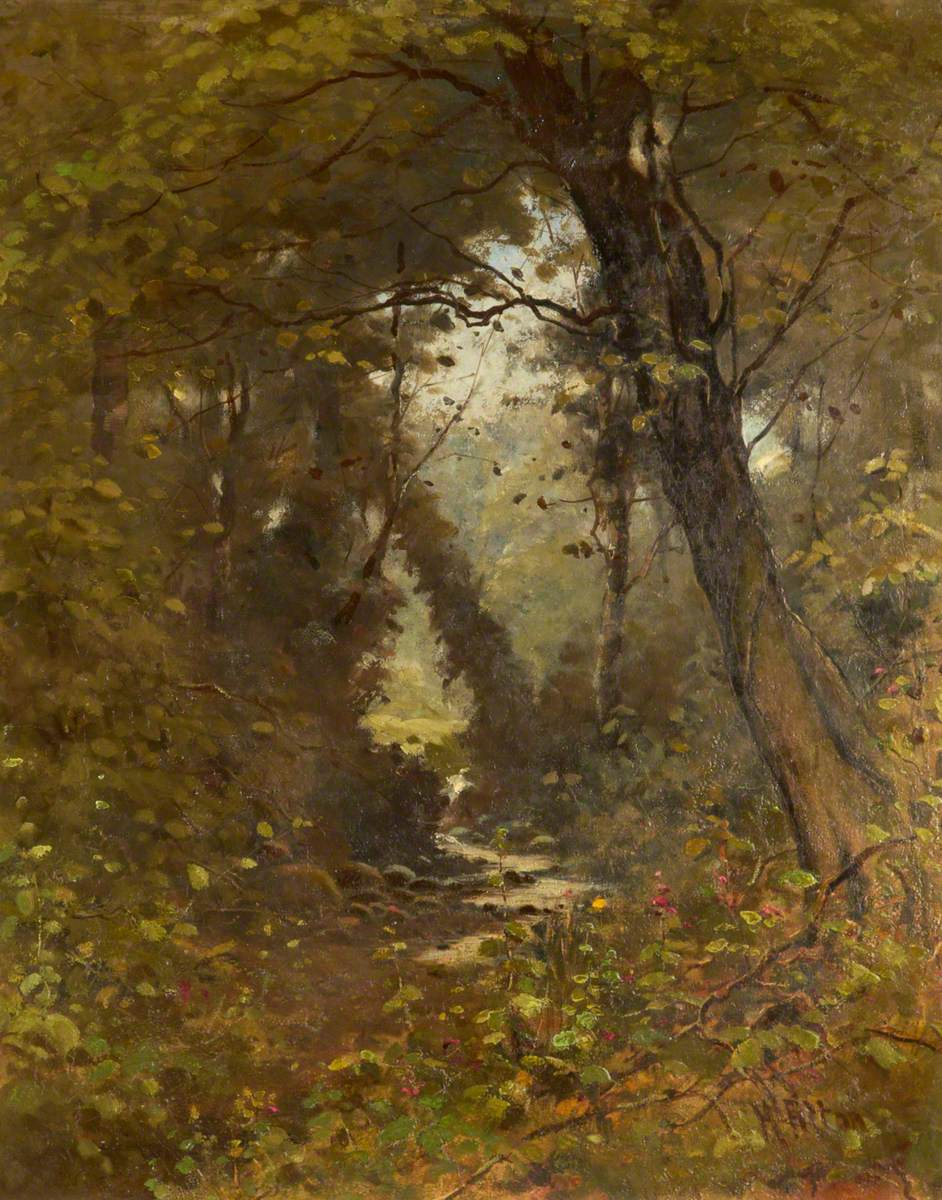
Painting of Flood Brook by Hedley Fitton in Runcorn Town Hall

Flood Brook passing under Beechwood Avenue and the Halton Curve railway line

Flood Brook passing under the Halton Curve railway line

Flood Brook passing under the M56 motorway Junction 12 slip road

Flood Brook passing under the M56 Junction 12 slip road

Flood Brook passing under the M56 Junction 12 slip road
