= Tongan tooth-billed pigeon =

Scientific classification
- Kingdom: Animalia
- Phylum: Chordata
- Class: Aves
- Order: Columbiformes
- Family: Columbidae
- Genus: Didunculus
- Species: †D. placopedetes

Binomial name
- †Didunculus placopedetes Steadman, 2006
- Approximate distribution map prior to extinction Year-round

Extinct species of bird

The Tongan tooth-billed pigeon (Didunculus placopedetes), is an extinct species of pigeon that was endemic to Tonga that lived in the Quaternary period. A related species, the tooth-billed pigeon (Didunculus strigirostris), is the only known living species in its genus.

== Description ==
The Tongan tooth-billed pigeon is described as looking similar to its relative, the tooth-billed pigeon, although it was larger. The Tongan tooth-billed pigeon is only defined by subfossils found at archaeological sites. A common predator of the Tongan tooth-billed pigeon was the barn owl (formerly T. a. lulu; now T. j. delicatula). It was about 31 to 38 centimetres long and weighed about 400 grams. with a short tail and a curved beak.

== Distribution and habitat ==
It was located on the Tongan islands of Tongatapu, Lifuka, Ha'ano, 'Uiha, and Ha'afeva and lived in terrestrial environments. Its diet consisted of raw fruit of the Rhus taitensis. It also ate seeds from Heliconia laufao, nutmegs from the genus Myristica, tuber from species in the genus of Dioscorea, and berries.

== Extinction ==
The Tongan tooth-billed pigeon disappeared sometime after the archipelago was colonised by humans around 1200 BC, probably due to hunting, loss of habitat, and the influence of introduced invasive species.
