= Beechwood, Runcorn =

Residential area in Runcorn, England

Coordinates: 53.316°N 2.702°W

Beechwood
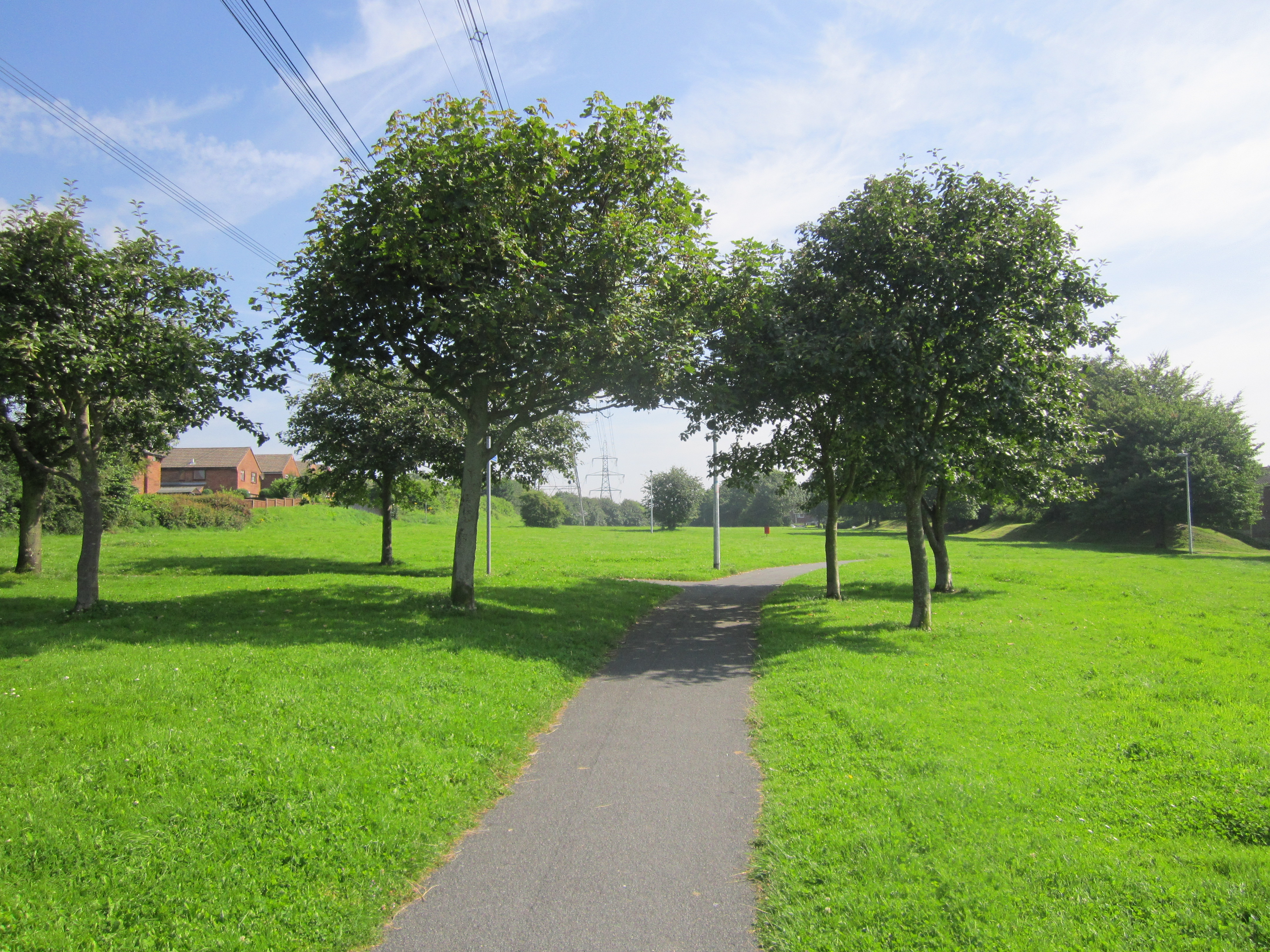
- A pedestrian footpath in Beechwood

- Location within Cheshire
- Unitary authority: Halton
- Ceremonial county: Cheshire
- Region: North West
- Country: England
- Sovereign state: United Kingdom
- Post town: RUNCORN
- Postcode district: WA7
- Dialling code: 01928
- Police: Cheshire
- Fire: Cheshire
- Ambulance: North West
- UK Parliament: Runcorn and Helsby

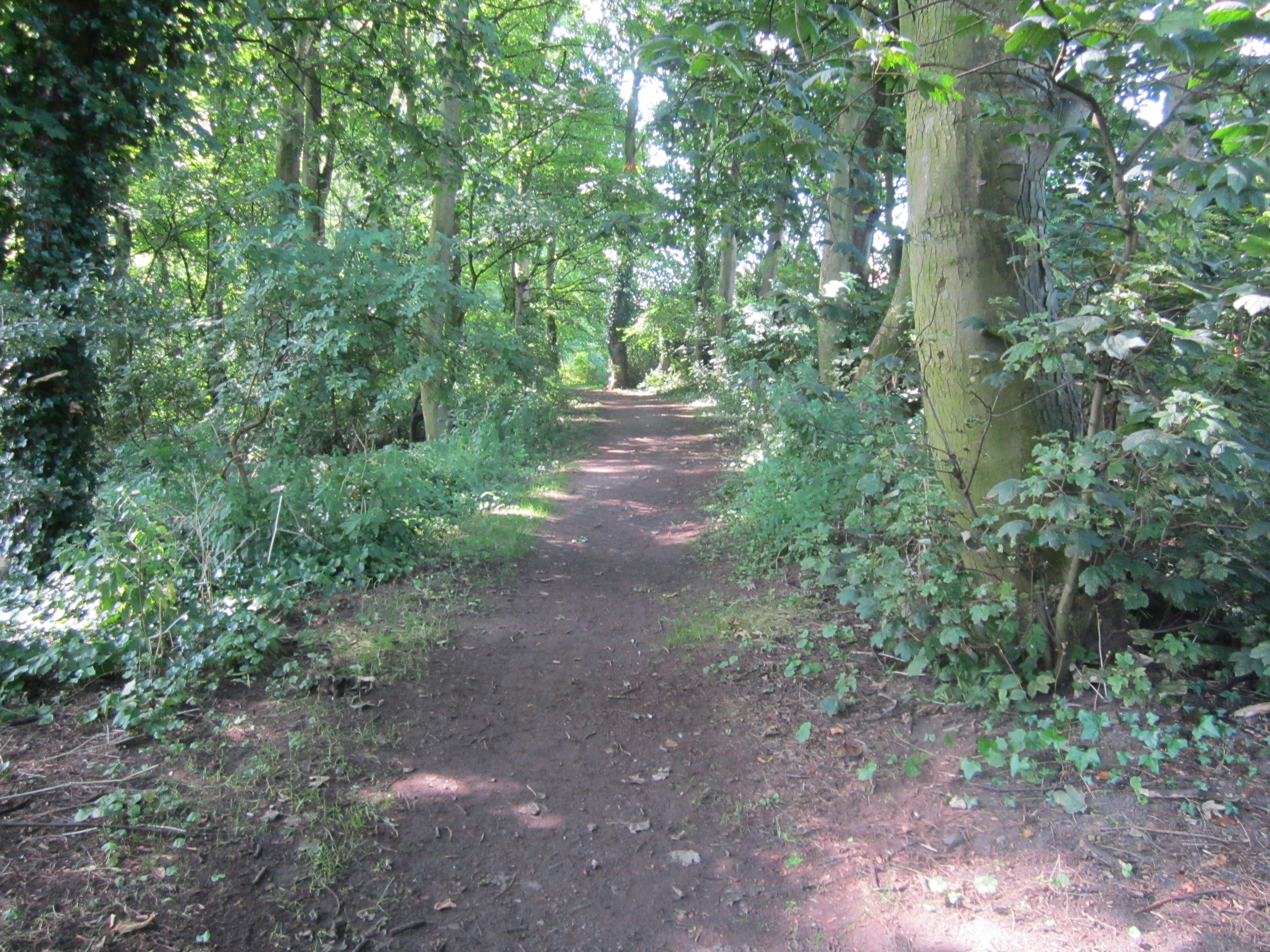
Flood Brook

Beechwood is a residential area of Runcorn, England. It was designated as part of Runcorn's New Town in 1964 and allocated for private housing in the masterplan of 1967. It is served by the A5126 road to the north, the A533 road to the east, the A557 road to the west, and the M56 motorway to the south.

The area is home to Beechwood Primary School, Hill View Primary School, a private community centre, a pub, a public swimming pool, a small Spar shop, and St Mark's Church which is shared by both Anglicans and Methodists. The wooded area of Beech Wood is managed by the Woodland Trust. Floodbrook Clough, an ancient woodland and site of special scientific interest, cuts through the centre of the community. It is one of Cheshire's best examples of clough woodland on keuper marl.
