= Raymond Ching =

New Zealand artist

Raymond Ching (born 1939), also known as Raymond Harris-Ching and Ray Ching, is a New Zealand painter. Ching is known for his contemporary bird and wildlife paintings. His ornithological illustrations have appeared in books such as The Reader's Digest Book of British Birds.

== Background ==
Ching was born in Wellington, New Zealand. Around the age of twelve, he dropped out of high school and started an apprenticeship in advertising, eventually becoming an art director. Dissatisfied with this career path, he turned to painting. A seminal experience from his youth has been noted as influencing his interest in ornithological illustration. During a class visit to a museum, Ching became fascinated by a collection of stuffed hummingbirds, inspiring a lifelong love and fascination with birds, feathers, and flight.

== Painting career ==
In the 1960s, Ching began to exhibit and sell paintings of birds. His first exhibition, 'Thirty Birds', at the John Leech Galleries in Auckland in 1966 was of highly detailed watercolours using drybrush technique, and was an immediate sell-out. He was discovered internationally by Sir William Collins of Collins publishing. A keen ornithologist, Sir William was scouring the world for bird painters to produce a prestigious series of books. Sir William came to New Zealand, attended Ching's second exhibition at the John Leech Galleries and discussed publishing a book of his work. On his return to the UK, Sir William brought some of Ching's work to his friend, Sir Peter Scott, who then telegraphed Ching, inviting him to call on him at Slimbridge.

Later, Ching moved to London, where he lived near Portobello Road. Before Collins had a chance to produce the book discussed with Sir William, Ray was introduced to The Reader's Digest who together with Collins, had been planning a major book about the birds of Britain. Almost every bird artist in the British Isles had been assessed and rejected as not having what was required to produce a breakthrough in field guides. The book, in addition to containing all the accurate information on the birds of Britain, should have the style and drama to appeal to those who have never picked up a field guide in their lives. The publishers had begun to despair of ever finding anyone with the graphic excitement they believed necessary, and the project had been almost abandoned when Ray appeared at the scene.

Deeply impressed with the originality and uniqueness of his work, the publishers quickly realised that he was the artist for The Reader's Digest Book of British Birds. They asked him how long he would need to paint the 230 full-colour portraits required. The publishers believed the project entailed as much as six years' work, and had earlier thought to spread the commission among six artists, each to take a year. Although he had arrived in England with the intention of getting on with his book, the offer struck a nerve in the young colonial wanting to make his mark. "I can do them all myself and in under a year!" he rashly declared. It was a huge effort and left him at the end of that year, ill, exhausted and penniless.

The Reader's Digest Book of British Birds, published in 1969, is a widely recognized illustrated reference book featuring the diverse bird species of Britain. Associated with the artwork of Raymond Ching, the book combines detailed illustrations with informative descriptions to help readers understand and identify different birds. It has been translated into more than ten European languages and published in numerous hardback and paperback editions. Its influence extends beyond bird enthusiasts to wildlife artists and natural history lovers, making it a notable contribution to bird illustration and ornithological literature.

P

Before the book was published Ray had moved to Rye, East Sussex. Here he continued to paint, primarily birds and other animals. He works in oils and watercolours, usually on a gessoed masonite panel or canvas which assists with the high detail. The style of his art might be described as conservative realism, most images having an almost photographic quality, although he is often comfortable leaving out detail in the backgrounds. Ching's work is primarily of birds, but has also included other wildlife landscapes and portraits.

Raymond Ching paintings usually fetch six figures. He continues to experiment with subject matter such as birds and the human figure in a series of imaginative works. He cannot be classified as a wildlife artist, which, although he admires many exponents of this genre, has never been his raison d'etre. His love of the look of birds and his desire to depict them, especially in flight, is his continuing passion. He is very interested and knowledgeable about conservation but that is not the primary driving force of his art.

He designed a British postage stamp in 1999 titled Darwin's Theory as part of a series on famous British scientists.

Ching is married to author Carol Sinclair who wrote the biography, Masters of the Wild: Ray Harris-Ching.

== Bibliography ==
- Book of British Birds, pub. The Reader’s Digest, London, 1969 Many editions (still in print)
- Raymond Ching, The Bird Paintings, watercolours and Pencil Drawings 1969-1975 pub. Collins, London,1978. Standard and limited editions
- The Art of Raymond Ching, pub. Collins, Auckland,1981
- Studies & Sketches of a Bird Painter, pub. Lansdowne, Melbourne,1981
- New Zealand Birds, An Artist’s Field-Studies, pub. Reed Methuen, Auckland, 1986
- Wild Portraits, The Wildlife Art of Ray Harris-Ching, co-pub. SeTo Publishing, Auckland, 1988 co-pub. Airlife Publishing, UK, 1988. Standard and limited editions
- Kiwis: A Monograph of the Family Aptergidae, pub. SeTo Publishing, Auckland, 1990. Standard and limited editions. ISBN 978-0-908697-49-6
- Ray Harris-Ching - Journey of an Artist, by Carol Sinclair Smith pub. Briar Patch Press, South Carolina, 1990. ISBN 978-0-87201-549-4
- Voice from the Wilderness, Ray Harris Ching-Errol Fuller-David Lank, Swan Hill Press, Shrewsbury, England, 1994. ISBN 978-1-85310-516-6
- Aesop’s Kiwi Fables, Bateman, by Ray Ching, Introduction by Richard Wolfe, pub. David Bateman Ltd, Auckland, 2012 ISBN 978-1-86953-845-3
- Drawn From Paradise: The Discovery, Art and Natural History of the Birds of Paradise, by Sir David Attenborough and Errol Fuller, Illustrations by Ray Ching, pub, Harper Collins, London, 2012 ISBN 978-0-00748-762-2
- Dawn Chorus: The Legendary Voyage to New Zealand of Aesop, the Fabled Teller of Fables, by Ray Ching, pub. David Bateman Ltd, 2014, 2019, ISBN 978-1-98-853810-5
- Aesop’s Outback Fables, by Ray Ching, pub. ARTIS Gallery, 2018, ISBN 978-0-473-41372-9
