= Hedley Fitton =

British engraver

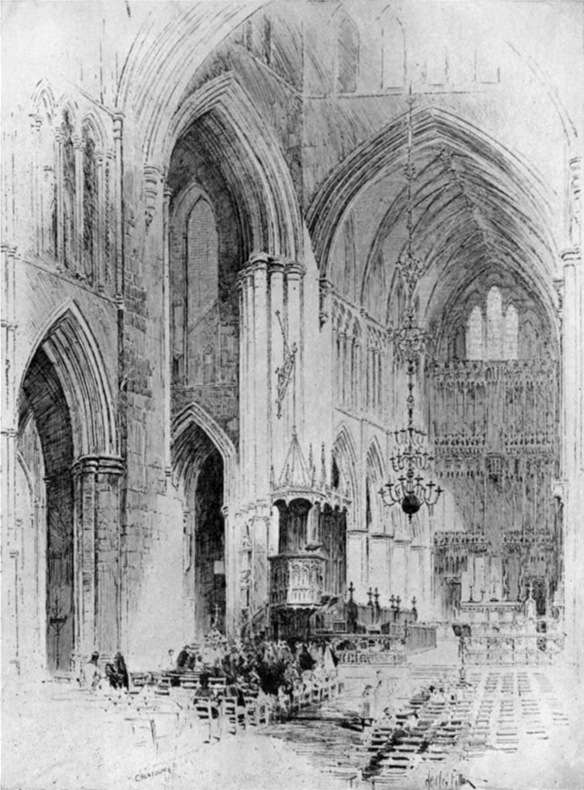
Southwark Cathedral

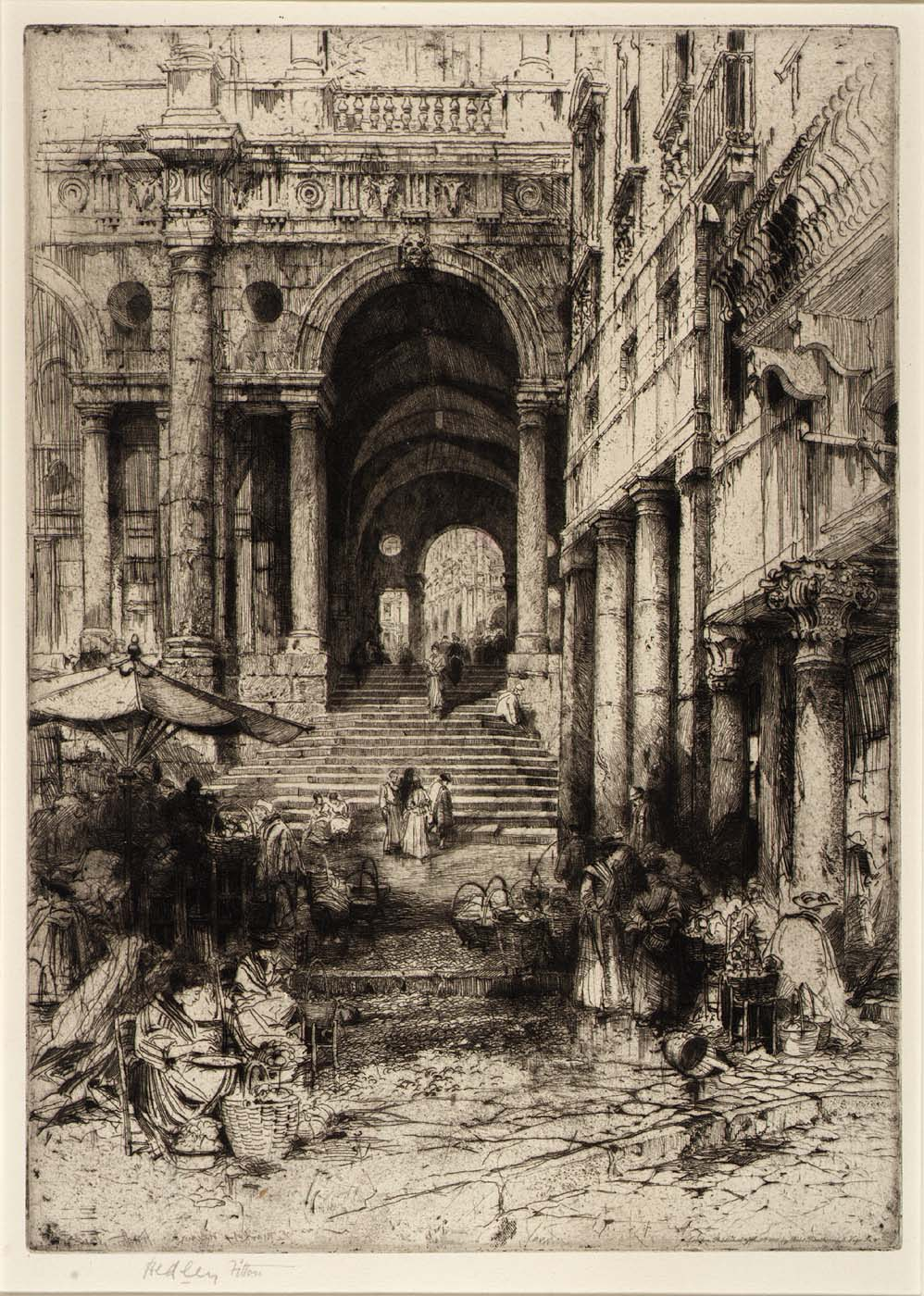
Little Market, Vincenzia, Italy (1918)

Hedley Fitton (c. 1858 – 19 July 1929) was an English engraver and printmaker noted mainly for his architectural etchings. His etchings included street scenes and important cathedrals in London, Florence, Edinburgh, Manchester, and Paris. In 1907 the Société des Artistes Français awarded Fitton a gold medal for his work.

Fitton was born in Didsbury, Manchester, and was a pupil at the Warrington School of Art in Cheshire. He travelled and worked extensively in England, Scotland, France and Italy. He lived in Didsbury in the 1890s, working as editor and illustrator for The Daily Chronicle in Manchester, and around 1898 at Shottermill in Surrey - the rest of his life was spent at Haslemere in Surrey.

Hedley Fitton was familiar with the old windmills on the southeast coast not far from London and produced a popular etching called The Two Mills. His best known works are The Pantheon, Rome and The Rose Window, Notre Dame. His etchings depict many of the venerated landmarks of the time.

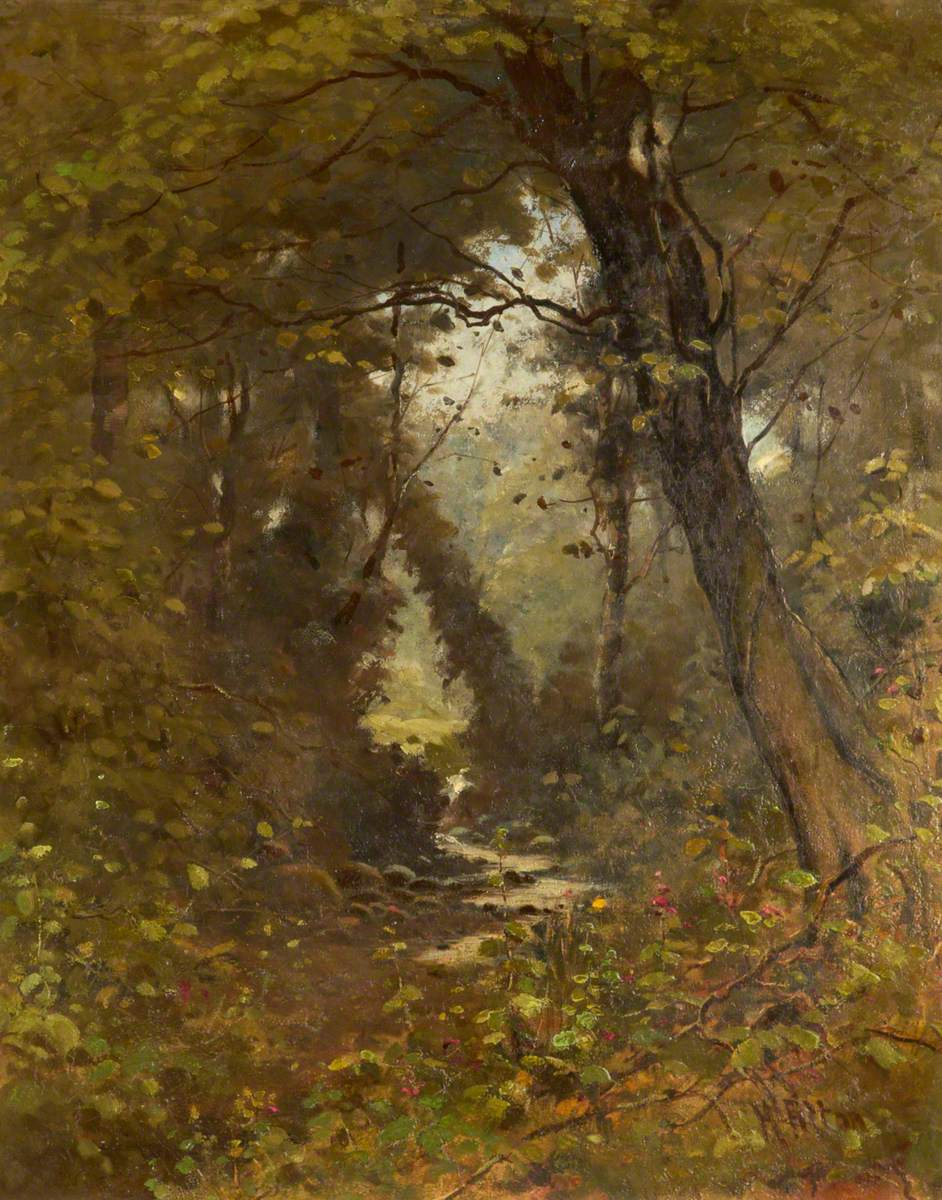
Flood Brook, Cheshire

His work was exhibited at the Royal Academy, Royal Society of Painter-Etchers and Engravers, Royal Watercolour Association and at the Paris Salon. His work is also held in the permanent collections of several institutions worldwide, including the Princeton University Art Museum, the La Salle University Art Museum, the British Museum, the Kirkcudbright Galleries, the Harvard Art Museums, the Detroit Institute of Arts, the Nelson-Atkins Museum of Art, the University of Michigan Museum of Art, the Smart Museum of Art, and Amgueddfa Cymru – Museum Wales.

He died in Haslemere, Surrey.

== Bibliography ==
- Dunthorne, Robert - Illustrated Catalogue of Etchings by Hedley Fitton, R.E. with Descriptions. (London, 1911)
- Fuller, Errol - Hedley Fitton: The Accent of Truth. (Tunbridge Wells, Kent, UK, 2010). ISBN 978-0-9533553-2-7
- Banks, Mrs. Linnaeus - The Manchester Man - Illustrated by Charles Green and Hedley Fitton - Manchester, Abel Heywood & Son (1896)
