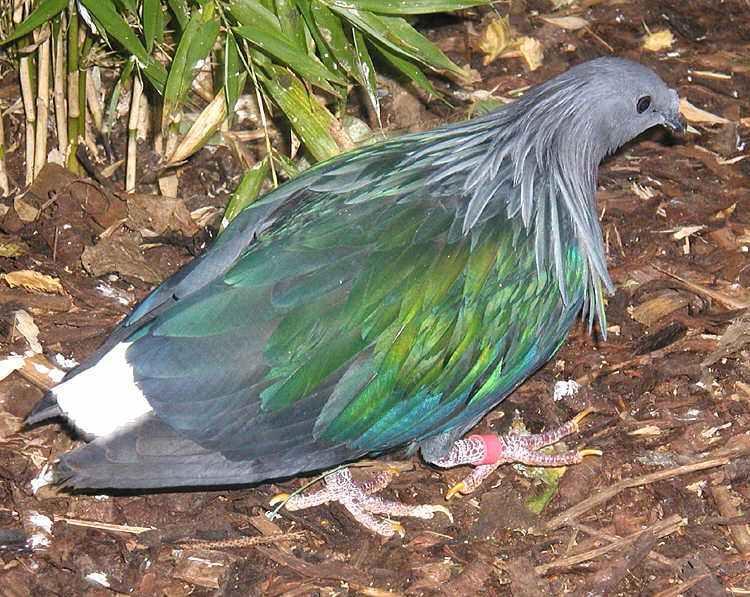
- Adult Nicobar pigeon

Scientific classification
- Kingdom: Animalia
- Phylum: Chordata
- Class: Aves
- Order: Columbiformes
- Family: Columbidae
- Genus: Caloenas; G.R. Gray, 1840

= Caloenas =

Genus of pigeons

Caloenas is a genus of pigeons. The only living species is the Nicobar pigeon (C. nicobarica).

One or two extinct species are known: the Kanaka pigeon was a large species from New Caledonia and Tonga. It is only known by subfossil remains and was probably hunted to extinction by the early settlers. The spotted green pigeon, another extinct species from an unknown locality, has only a slight similarity to the Nicobar pigeon due to its neck feathers. Ornithologists place it in this genus, but there is not a unanimous agreement. One specimen exists in the Liverpool Museum.

== Taxonomy ==
The genus Caloenas was introduced by the English zoologist George Robert Gray in 1840 to accommodate the Nicobar pigeon. The genus name combines the Ancient Greek kalos meaning "beautiful" with oinas meaning "dove".

The genus contains two species:

- Nicobar pigeon (Caloenas nicobarica)
- † Spotted green pigeon (Caloenas maculata)

Sometimes included in the genus is a species that probably became extinct 2,500 years ago:

- † Kanaka pigeon (Caloenas canacorum) Balouet & Olson, 1989
