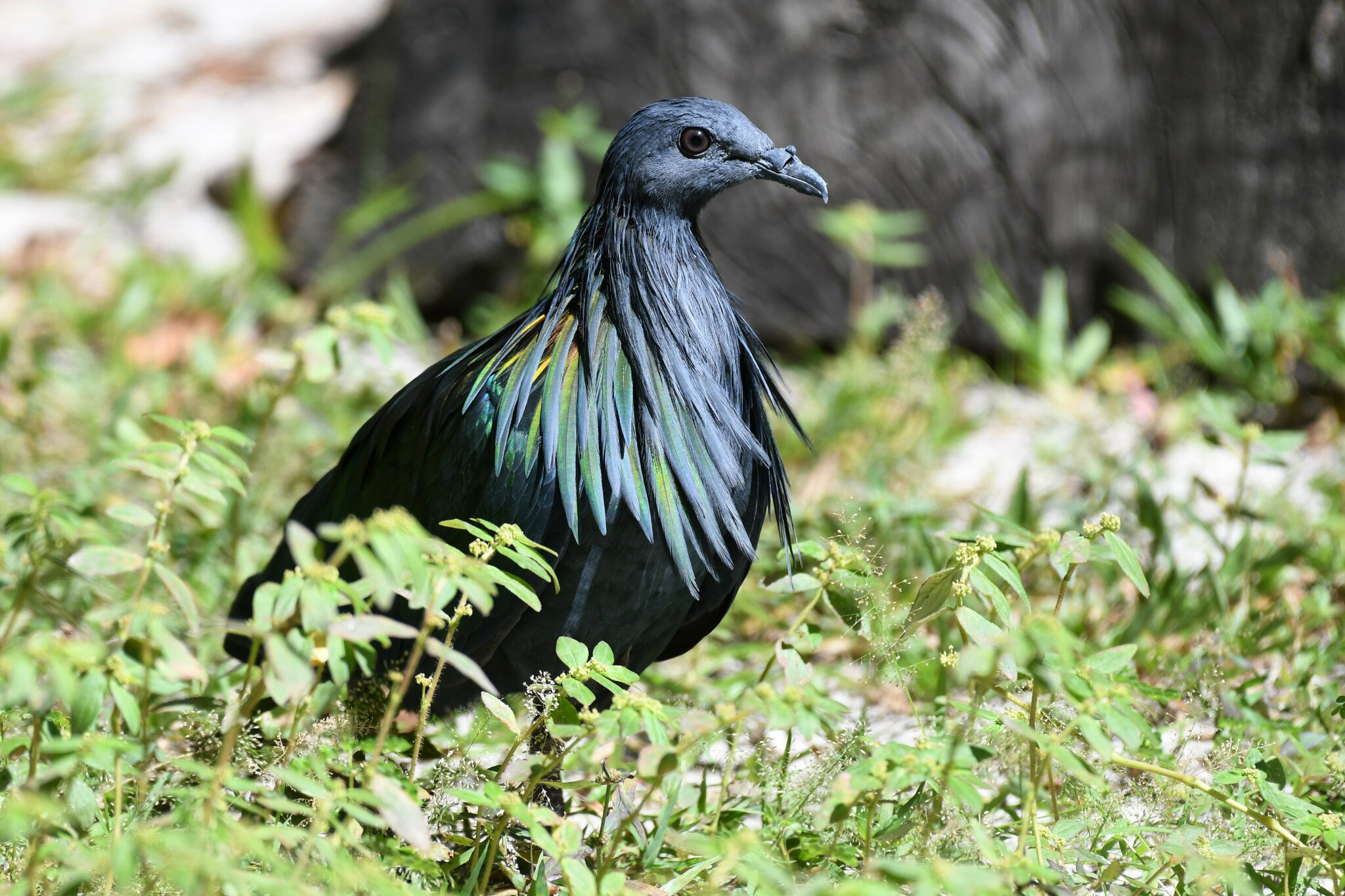
- Adult on Ko Miang, off the southwest coast of Thailand

Conservation status
- Near Threatened (IUCN 3.1)
- CITES Appendix I

Scientific classification
- Kingdom: Animalia
- Phylum: Chordata
- Class: Aves
- Order: Columbiformes
- Family: Columbidae
- Genus: Caloenas
- Species: C. nicobarica

Binomial name
- Caloenas nicobarica (Linnaeus, 1758)

Synonyms
- Columba nicobarica Linnaeus, 1758

= Nicobar pigeon =

Species of bird

The Nicobar pigeon or Nicobar dove (Caloenas nicobarica, Car: ma-kūö-kö) is a bird found on small islands and in coastal regions from the Andaman and Nicobar Islands, India, east through the Indonesian Archipelago, to the Solomons and Palau. It is the only living member of the genus Caloenas alongside the extinct spotted green pigeon and Kanaka pigeon, and is the closest living relative of the extinct dodo and Rodrigues solitaire.

== Taxonomy ==
In 1738, the English naturalist Eleazar Albin included a description and two illustrations of the Nicobar pigeon in his A Natural History of Birds. When in 1758 the Swedish naturalist Carl Linnaeus updated his Systema Naturae for the tenth edition, he placed the Nicobar pigeon with all the other pigeons in the genus Columba. Linnaeus included a brief description, coined the binomial name Columba nicobarica and cited Albin's work. The species is now placed in the genus Caloenas erected by English zoologist George Robert Gray in 1840 with the Nicobar pigeon as the type species.

Two subspecies are recognised:

- C. n. nicobarica (Linnaeus, 1758) – Andaman and Nicobar Islands, Malay Archipelago to New Guinea, Philippines and Solomon Islands
- C. n. pelewensis Finsch, 1875 – Palau Island

The two subspecies are very similar, with C. n. pelewensis being marginally smaller and with the elongated neck feathers being slightly shorter.

Based on cladistic analysis of mtDNA cytochrome b and 12S rRNA sequences, the Nicobar pigeon is sometimes called the closest living relative of the extinct didines (Raphinae), which include the famous dodo (Raphus cucullatus). However, the study's results showed this as one weak possibility from a limited sample of taxa. In any case, nDNA β-fibrinogen intron 7 sequence data agrees with the idea of the Raphinae as a subfamily of pigeons (and not an independent family, as was previously believed due to their bizarre apomorphies) that was part of a diverse Indopacific radiation, to which the Nicobar pigeon also belongs.

The following cladogram, from Shapiro and colleagues (2002), shows the Nicobar pigeon's closest relationships within Columbidae, a clade consisting of generally ground-dwelling island endemics.

- - Didunculus strigirostris (tooth-billed pigeon)
  - - Goura victoria (Victoria crowned pigeon)
    - - - - Caloenas nicobarica (Nicobar pigeon)
          - - †Pezophaps solitaria (Rodrigues solitaire)
            - †Raphus cucullatus (dodo)

A similar cladogram was published in 2007, differing only in the inverted placement of Goura and Didunculus, as well as in the inclusion of the pheasant pigeon and the thick-billed ground pigeon at the base of the clade.

C. nicobarica is a quite singular columbiform (though less autapomorphic than the flightless Raphinae), as are for example the tooth-billed pigeon (Didunculus strigirostris) and the crowned pigeons (Goura), which are typically considered distinct subfamilies. Hence, the Nicobar pigeon may well constitute another now-monotypic subfamily. And while any of the semi-terrestrial pigeons of Southeast Asia and the Wallacea cannot be excluded as possible closest living relative of the Raphinae, the Nicobar pigeon makes a more plausible candidate than for example the group of imperial-pigeons and fruit-doves, which seems to be part of the same radiation.

Whether it is possible to clarify such deep-time phylogenies without a comprehensive study of all major lineages of living Columbidae remains to be seen. The primitive molecular clock used to infer the date the ancestors of the Nicobar pigeon and the didines diverged has since turned out to be both unreliable and miscalibrated. But what little evidence is available still suggests that the Nicobar pigeon is distinct from all other living lifeforms since the Paleogene – most likely some time between 56–34 million years ago during the Eocene, which makes up the bulk of the Paleogene period.

From subfossil bones found on New Caledonia and Tonga, an extinct species of Caloenas, the Kanaka pigeon (C. canacorum) was described. It was about one-quarter larger than the Nicobar pigeon. Considering that it must have been a good source of food, it was most likely hunted to extinction by the first human settlers of its home islands. It probably was extinct by 500 BC. The spotted green pigeon (C. maculata) is a more recently extinct species from an unknown Pacific locality; it probably disappeared in the 19th century and most likely succumbed to introduced European rats. It is placed in Caloenas as the least awkward possibility; its true affinities are presently indeterminate and it is perhaps more likely to represent a distinct genus of the Indopacific radiation of Columbidae.

== Description ==
It is a large pigeon, measuring 32–35 cm (13–14 in) in length. The head is grey, like the upper neck plumage, which turns into green and copper hackles. The tail is short and pure white. The rest of its plumage is metallic green, appearing black in dull light. The cere of the dark bill forms a small blackish knob; the strong legs and feet are dull red. The irises are dark.

Females, weighing 490–600 g (17–21 oz), are on average slightly larger than the 460–525 g (16.2–18.5 oz) males, but with much overlap; they have a smaller bill knob, shorter hackles and browner underparts. Immature birds have a black tail and lack almost all iridescence. There is hardly any variation across the birds' wide range. Even the Palau subspecies C. n. pelewensis merely has shorter neck hackles, but is otherwise almost identical.

It is a very vocal species, giving a low-pitched repetitive call.

== Distribution and habitat ==
On the Nicobar Islands (which are referred to in its common and scientific names), the most significant colony of Nicobar pigeons in modern times was found on Batti Malv, a remote wildlife sanctuary between Car Nicobar and Teressa. The 2004 Indian Ocean tsunami caused massive damage on the Nicobar Islands, and to what extent Batti Malv was affected is still not clear. But while everything on some islets in the Great Nicobar Biosphere Reserve was destroyed, Batti Malv lighthouse – a skeletal tower a dozen metres high, standing a few metres ASL at the highest point of the low-lying island – was little-damaged and put back in operation by the survey ship INS Sandhayak less than one month after the disaster. An April 2007 survey by the Indian Coast Guard vessel ICGS Vikram found the lighthouse tower "totally covered" in vines, indicating rampant regeneration of vegetation – but perhaps also that damage to the island's forest was severe, as a cover of creeping plants is typical of early succession stages, while a photo of the lighthouse taken before the tsunami shows rather mature forest.

=== Found in Australia ===
A Nicobar pigeon was found by the Bardi Jawi Indigenous rangers on the Dampier Peninsula in the western Kimberley region of Australia in May 2017. As part of biosecurity measures, it was reported to quarantine services and was removed by Australian Department of Agriculture officials. In 2023, another individual was found on Green Island, off the coast of Cairns. Green Island Resort's environmental manager contacted authorities, but there are currently no plans to relocate the pigeon.

== Behaviour and ecology ==
The Nicobar pigeon's breeding range encompasses the Andaman and Nicobar Islands of India, the Mergui Archipelago of Myanmar, offshore islands of south-western Thailand, Peninsular Malaysia, southern Cambodia and Vietnam, and many of the small islands between Sumatra, the Philippines and the Solomon Islands. On Palau, the only distinct subspecies C. n. pelewensis is found.

The Nicobar pigeon roams in flocks from island to island, usually sleeping on offshore islets where no predators occur and spends the day in areas with better food availability, not shying away from areas inhabited by humans. Its diet consists of seeds, fruit, and buds, and it is attracted to areas where grain is available. A gizzard stone helps to grind up hard food items. Its flight is quick, with regular beats and an occasional sharp flicks of the wings, as is characteristic of pigeons in general. Unlike other pigeons, groups tend to fly in columns or single file, not in a loose flock. The prominent white tail, visible in flight from behind, may serve as a sort of "taillight", helping keep flocks together when crossing the sea at dawn or dusk. The young birds' lack of a white tail is a signal of their immaturity clearly visible to conspecifics – to an adult Nicobar pigeon, it is obvious at a glance which flockmembers are neither potential mates, nor potential competitors for mates, nor old enough to safely guide a flock from one island to another. When flying between islands, it typically flies high, at least 60 metres above the sea surface.

This species nests in dense forest on offshore islets, often in large colonies. It builds a loose stick nest in a tree. It lays one elliptical faintly blue-tinged white egg.

In 2017, several individual Caloenas nicobarica were sighted in the Kimberley region of Western Australia with a juvenile captured at Ardyaloon (One Arm Point), near Broome – the first time the bird has been sighted on the Australian mainland.

== Conservation ==
Nicobar pigeons are hunted in considerable numbers for food, and also for their gizzard stones which have sometimes been used in jewellery. The species is also trapped for the local pet market, but as it is on CITES Appendix I, commercial international trade is prohibited. Internationally, captive breeding is able to supply the birds demanded by zoos, where this attractive and unusual bird is often seen. Direct exploitation of the species, even including the illegal trade, might be sustainable on its own; however, its available nesting habitat is decreasing. The offshore islets which it requires are often logged for plantations, destroyed by construction activity, or polluted by nearby industry or harbours. Also, increased travel introduces predators to more and more of the breeding sites, and colonies of the Nicobar pigeon may be driven to desert such locations or be destroyed outright. Though the bird is widely distributed and in some locations very common (even on small Palau it is still reasonably plentiful, with an estimated 1,000 adult birds remaining), its long-term future is increasingly in jeopardy. For these reasons, the IUCN considers C. nicobarica a near threatened species.

== Gallery ==
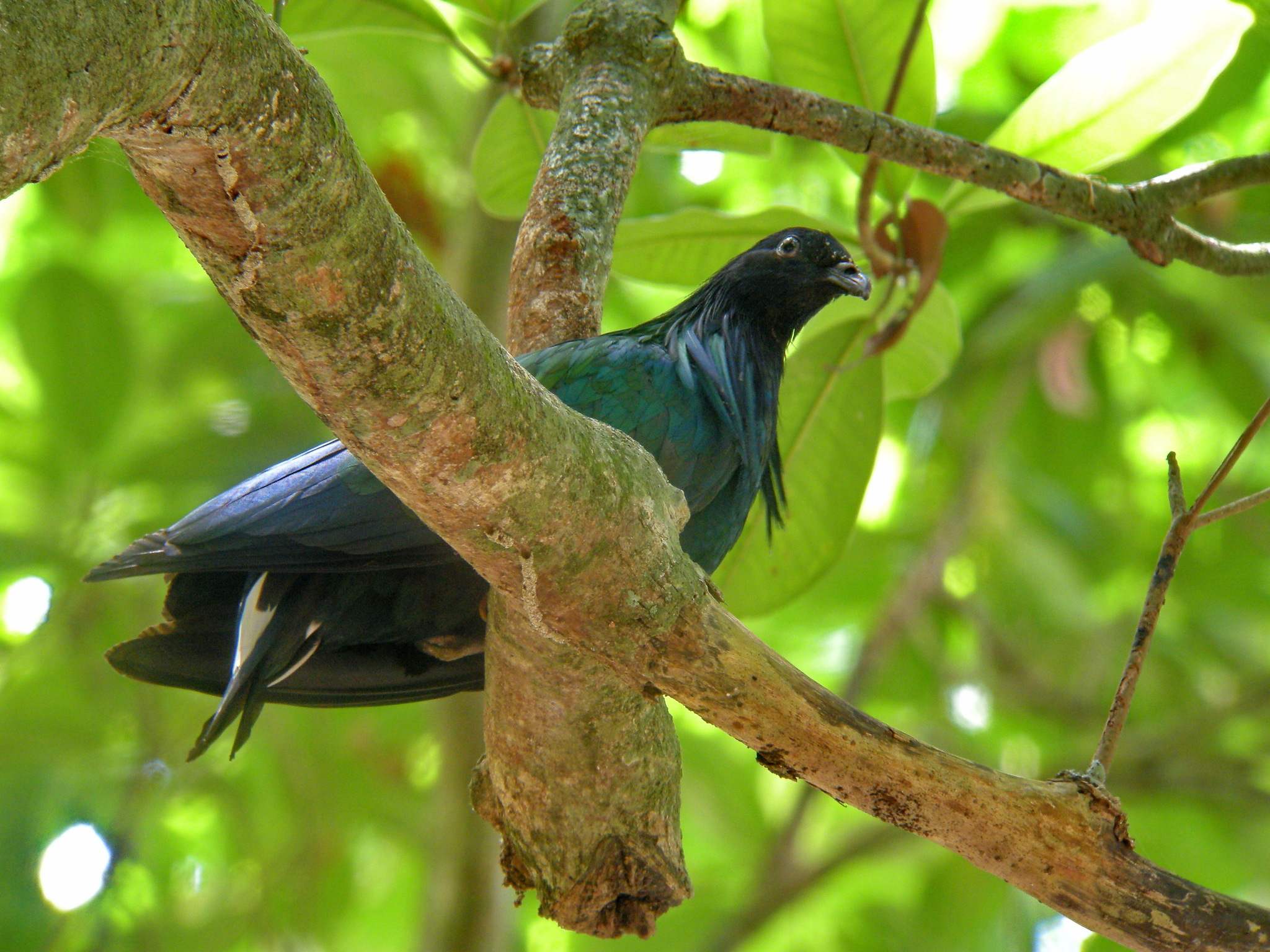
The white tail is the most conspicuous feature of adult Nicobar pigeons, particularly when seen at a distance in twilight.

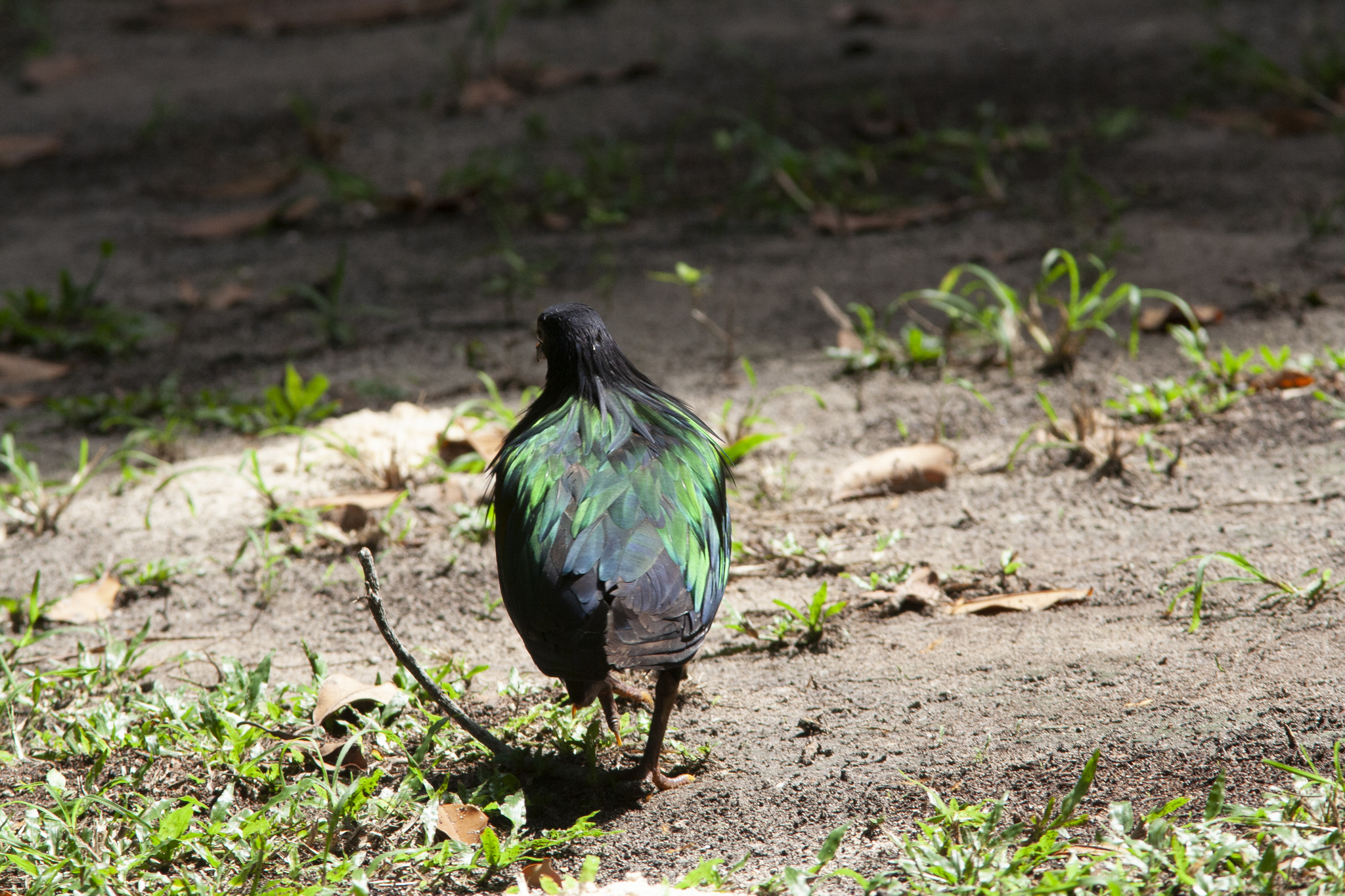
An adult on Mu Ko Similan in the Similan Islands, Thailand, showing the iridescent scapulars

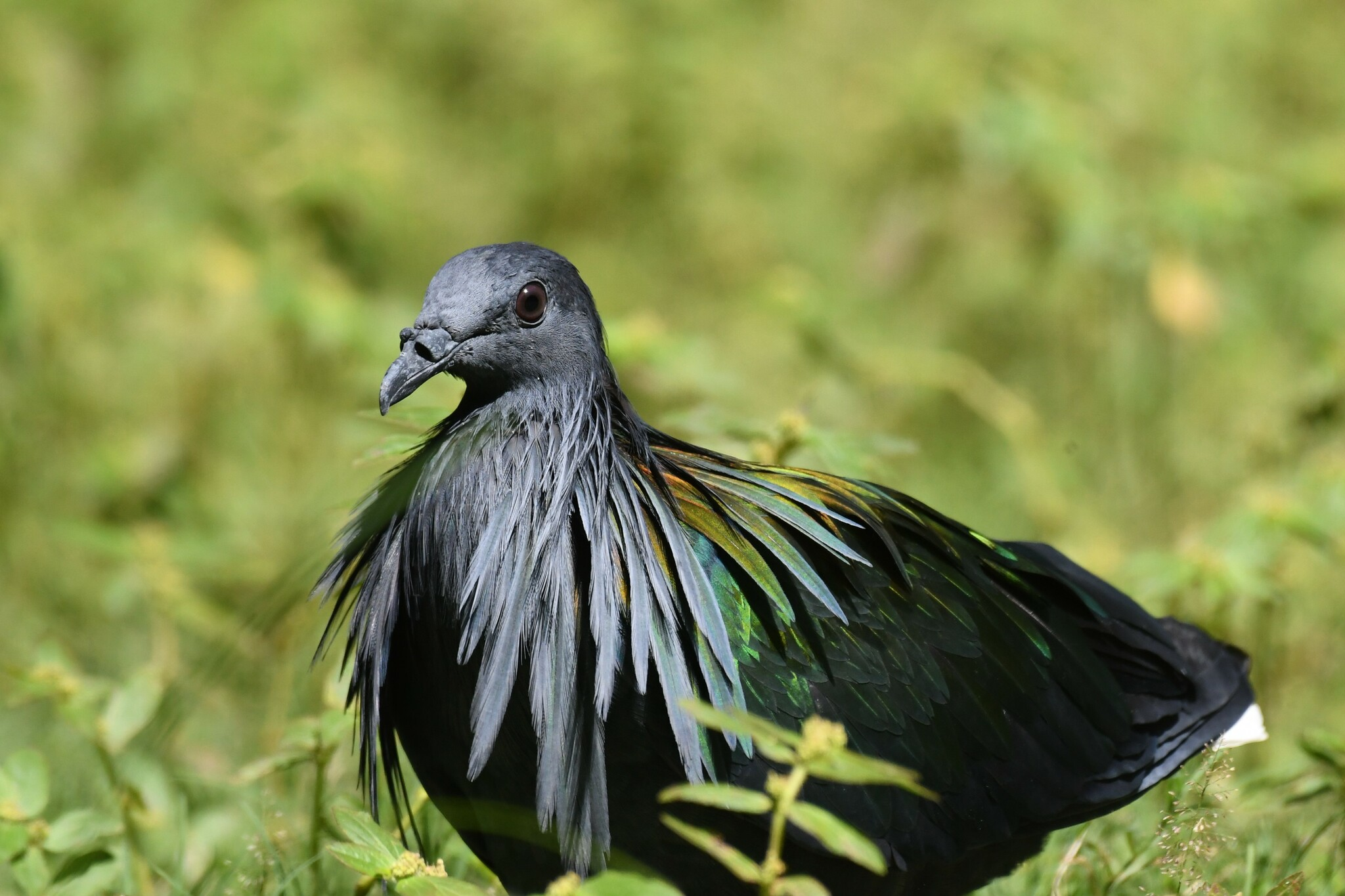
Close up of the head, Ko Miang, Similan Islands, Thailand

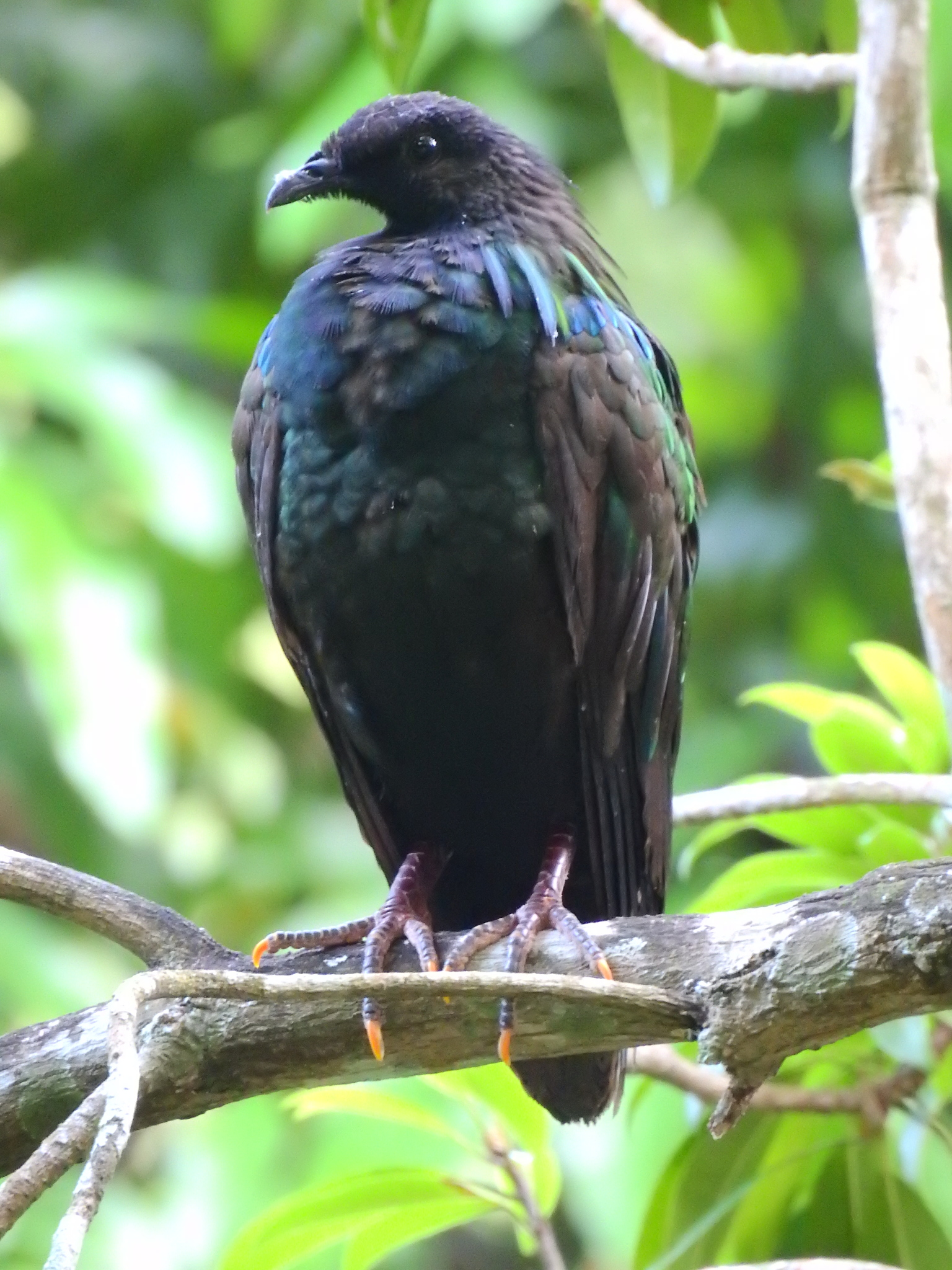
Nicobar pigeon on Narcondam Island in the Andaman and Nicobar Islands

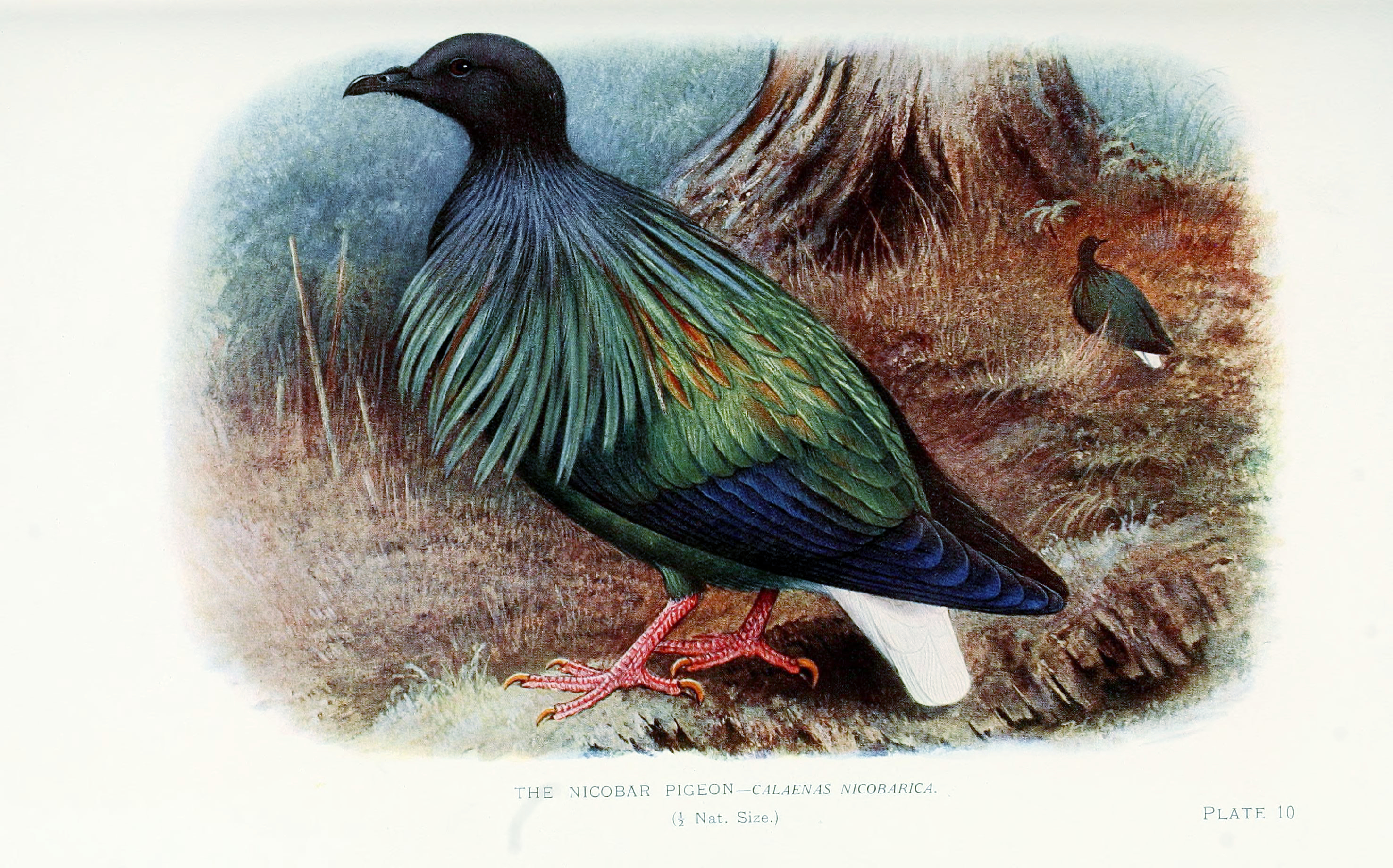
Painting by Henrik Grønvold

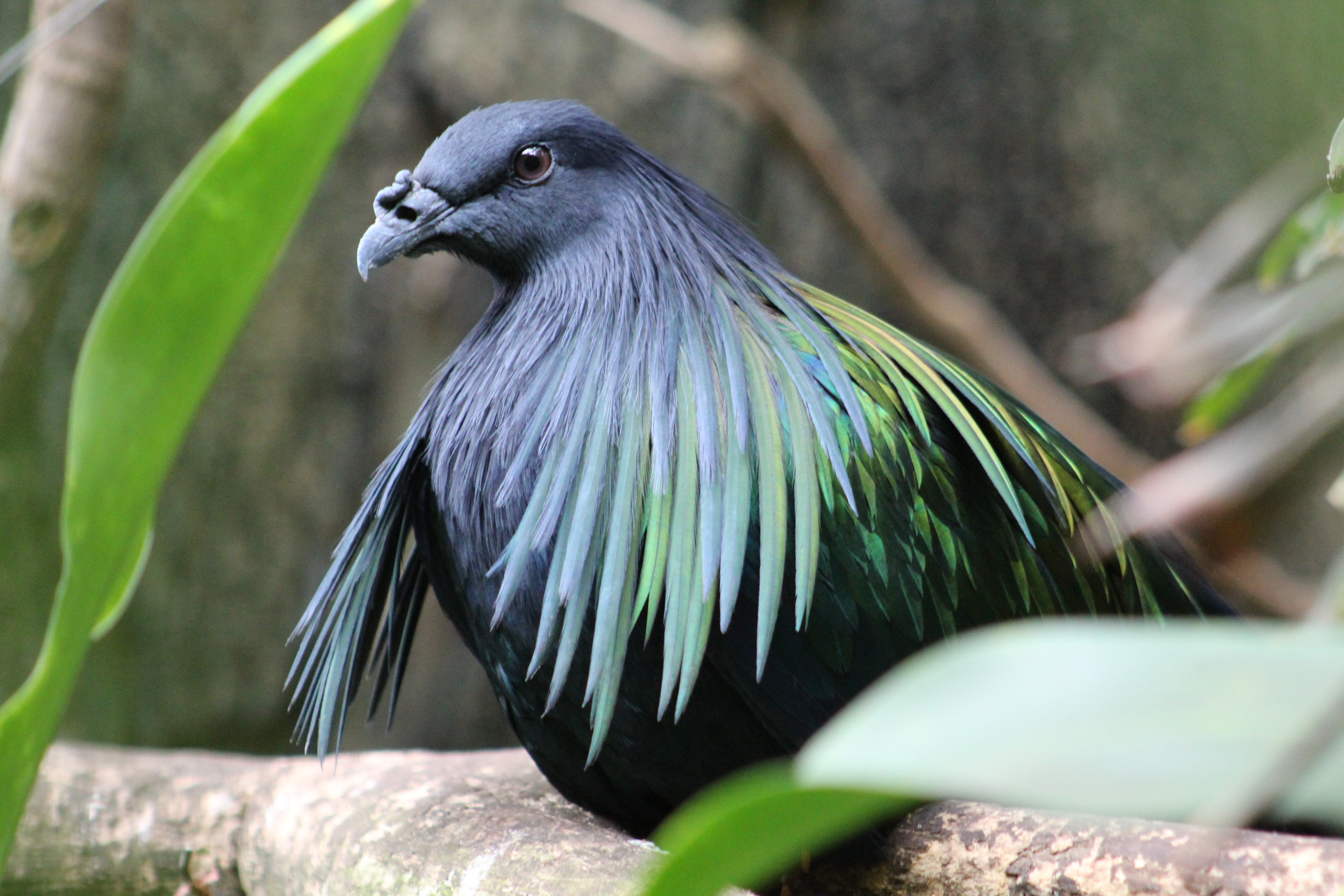
Nicobar pigeon in a zoo

== Sources ==
- Fuller, Errol (2000). Extinct Birds (2nd ed.). Oxford, New York: Oxford University Press. ISBN 978-0-19-850837-3.
- Grimmett, Richard; Inskipp, Carol; Inskipp, Tim; Byers, Clive (2009) [1999]. Birds of India, Pakistan, Nepal, Bangladesh, Bhutan, Sri Lanka, and the Maldives. Princeton, N.J: Princeton University Press. ISBN 978-0-691-04910-6.
- Indian Coast Guard (ICG) (2007): Andaman & Nicobar Region News, September 2007. Retrieved 2009-MAY-22.
- Integrated Headquarters of Ministry of Defence (Navy) (IHMDN) (2005): Relief Assistance Provided by Indian Navy – Update 19 January 05. Version of 2005-JAN-19. Retrieved 2009-MAY-22.
- Johnson, Kevin P.; Clayton, Dale H. (2000). "Nuclear and Mitochondrial Genes Contain Similar Phylogenetic. Signal for Pigeons and Doves (Aves: Columbiformes)" (PDF). Molecular Phylogenetics and Evolution. 14 (1): 141–151. Bibcode:2000MolPE..14..141J. doi:10.1006/mpev.1999.0682. PMID 10631048. Archived from the original (PDF) on 2005-10-16.
- Pereira, S. L.; Johnson, K. P.; Clayton, D. H.; Baker, A. J. (2007). "Mitochondrial and nuclear DNA sequences support a Cretaceous origin of Columbiformes and a dispersal-driven radiation in the Paleogene". Systematic Biology. 56 (4): 656–672. doi:10.1080/10635150701549672. PMID 17661233.
- Rowlett, Russ (2008-10-01). "Lighthouses of India: Andaman and Nicobar Islands". The Lighthouse Directory. University of North Carolina at Chapel Hill.
- Sankaran, R (1998). "An annotated list of the endemic avifauna of the Nicobar islands" (PDF). Forktail. 13: 17–22. Archived from the original (PDF) on 2011-06-10.
- Shapiro, B.; Sibthorpe, D.; Rambaut, A.; Austin, J.; Wragg, G. M.; Bininda-Emonds, O. R. P.; Lee, P. L. M.; Cooper, A. (2002). "Flight of the Dodo" (PDF). Science. 295 (5560): 1683. doi:10.1126/science.295.5560.1683. PMID 11872833. Supplementary information
- Slack, Kerryn E.; Jones, Craig M.; Ando, Tatsuro; Harrison, G.L. "Abby; Fordyce, R. Ewan; Arnason, Ulfur; Penny, David (2006). "Early Penguin Fossils, plus Mitochondrial Genomes, Calibrate Avian Evolution". Molecular Biology and Evolution. 23 (6): 1144–1155. doi:10.1093/molbev/msj124. PMID 16533822. Supplementary Material
