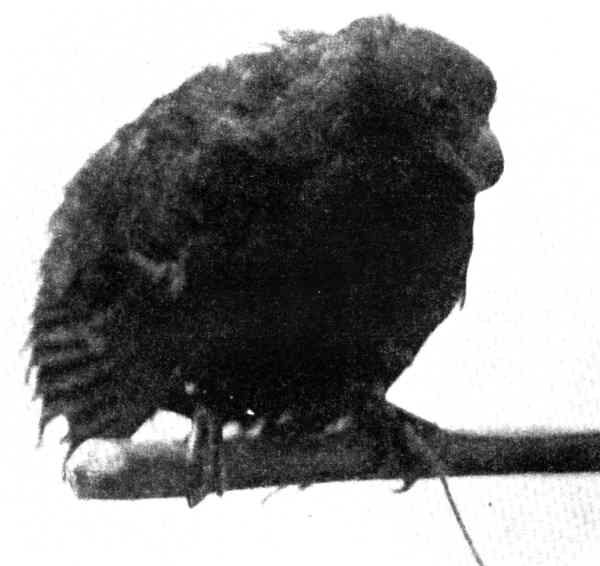
- Live specimen of Didunculus strigirostris in 1901

Scientific classification
- Kingdom: Animalia
- Phylum: Chordata
- Class: Aves
- Order: Columbiformes
- Family: Columbidae
- Tribe: Raphini
- Genus: Didunculus; Jardine, 1845 (Note: The name has long been erroneously been credited to Peale, 1848, but it was actually first published by William Jardine in 1845. Because the name was also first published in synonymy with Jardine's Gnathodon, Didunculus must be credited to Jardine following Article 50.7 of the ICZN, even though it is credited to Titian Peale in the text.)

Species
- Two species, see article

Synonyms
- Gnathodon Jardine, 1845 (not G.B.Sowerby I, 1832)

= Didunculus =

Tooth-billed pigeons

Genus of birds

The tooth-billed pigeons are the only genus (Didunculus) of the subfamily Didunculinae, in the pigeon and dove family, (Columbidae). It has no close living relatives, but it has been shown to be genetically close to the dodo, and the genus name Didunculus means "little dodo". The jaw and tongue structure, and the superficially parrotlike bill have suggested a relationship to the parrots, but these features have arisen from its specialised diet rather than any real relationship.

== Species ==
Two species are known:

- †Didunculus placopedetes, Tongan tooth-billed pigeon
- Didunculus strigirostris, Tooth-billed pigeon

The Tongan tooth-billed pigeon (Didunculus placopedetes bebefolis) is only known from subfossil remains in several archaeological sites in Tonga dating 2700–2850 BP and now extinct. The tooth-billed pigeon (Didunculus strigirostris) from Samoa is critically endangered.
