= Errol Fuller =

English writer and author

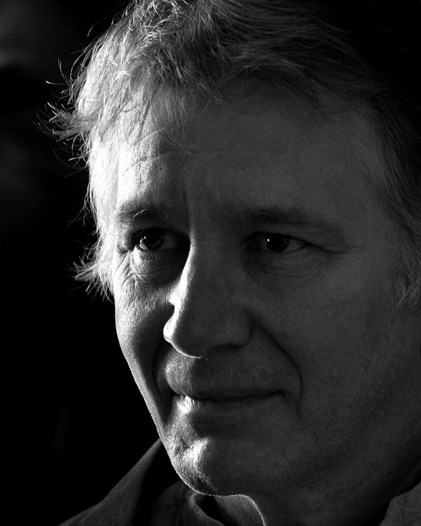
- Born: 19 June 1947 (age 79); Blackpool, Lancashire, England
- Occupations: Author and painter
- Known for: Books on extinction
- Website: http://errolfuller.com/

Errol Fuller (born 19 June 1947) is an English writer and artist who lives in Tunbridge Wells, Kent. He was born in Blackpool, Lancashire, grew up in South London, and was educated at Addey and Stanhope School. He is the author of a series of books on extinction and extinct creatures.

== Reception ==
=== Extinct Birds ===
Andrew Sugden, reviewing Extinct Birds (1987) in the London Review of Books, notes that Fuller set out "to find at least one drawing, painting or lithograph: many by the great 19th-century illustrator J.G. Keulemans, a couple (great auk and Himalayan mountain quail) by Edward Lear. He also embellishes the historical account where possible with portraits of the sailors, explorers and naturalists who recorded (and sometimes helped to extinguish) a species and biographical snippets about them – all of which provides an important context for the extinctions themselves. Most of these species vanished, of course, before we had film of sufficient speed for wildlife photography", he found little to say about some of the species, "the lives and deaths of many species having passed almost unnoticed (which makes it all the more remarkable that Fuller was able to unearth so many pictures)", and contrasts this 18th-century situation with what happens now, when there is often a mass of data on vanishing species.

John A. Burton, reviewing the book in Oryx, begins by saying "I must make it absolutely clear that this is a very useful, and well-researched book, which deserves to find a place on the shelves of any reasonable conservation-oriented library", and compliments Fuller on "his comprehensiveness and detail." He found the illustrations to include "splendid examples" of work by Edward Lear, Joseph Wolf and J.G. Keulemans.

=== The Great Auk ===
- Fuller, Errol (1999). The Great Auk. Southborough, Kent: Errol Fuller. ISBN 0-9533553-0-6.

The book of more than 450 pages is entirely devoted to the extinct great auk (Pinguinus impennis). It holds, apart from detailed descriptions of the history, ecology, habits and distribution of the "garefowl" (an old English name), a great many illustrations – often dating back to the 19th century – , details on 78 preserved specimen of the bird, worldwide, and 76 eggs.

Writing in The Guardian, Claire Armitstead commented that "Errol Fuller's magnificent self-published The Great Auk" was "one of the most astonishing books to cross my desk", and wrote that it was

everything you wanted to know about an extinct bird. Besides all those beautiful 19th-century auk portraits, there are auk anecdotes, auk eggs... I'm not a great fan of bird books, but this irresistible folly captured a buccaneering spirit that sometimes seems as dead as the auk itself.

=== Dodo: From Extinction to Icon ===
Reviewing Dodo: From Extinction to Icon (2002), Stephen Moss, also in The Guardian, wrote that Fuller has

assembled a fine defence of this much-maligned creature. In doing so he has produced a curious book, which although not up to the stature of his magnificent tome on the Great auk, is nevertheless fascinating.

=== The Passenger Pigeon ===
Reviewing Fuller's The Passenger Pigeon (2014) for The Guardian, the blogger GrrlScientist writes that the book's brief text provides a good introduction for people who know little about the bird, but that the book's primary purpose is "to provide a visual context for the history of passenger pigeons. Many of its pages are lavishly illustrated with rare photographs of the birds", while "Also included are some of the sketches and paintings, music and poetry that the pigeons inspired, as well as some items of historical interest."

== Bibliography ==
- Ching, Raymond; with Additional Text by Fuller, Errol (1981). Studies & Sketches of a Bird Painter. Melbourne/New York: Lansdowne Editions.
- Fuller, Errol (1987). Extinct Birds. Penguin Books. ISBN 978-0-670-81787-0.
- Fuller, Errol (1990). Kiwis. Seto Publishing Auckland. ISBN 0-908697-49-X.
- Fuller, Errol (1995). The Lost Birds of Paradise. Swan Hill Press. ISBN 1-85310-566-X
- Fuller, Errol (1999). The Great Auk. ISBN 0-9533553-0-6
- Fuller, Errol (2000). Extinct Birds. Revised ed. Oxford University Press. ISBN 0-19-850837-9
- Fuller, Errol (2002). Dodo: From Extinction to Icon. HarperCollins. ISBN 0-00-714572-1
- Hoyo, J. and Elliott, A. (2002). Handbook of the Birds of the World. Volume 7: Jacamars to Woodpeckers. Introductory essay by Errol Fuller. Barcelona: Lynx Editions.
- Fuller, Errol (2003). The Dodo: Extinction in Paradise. Bunker Hill Publishing Inc.
- Fuller, Errol (2003). The Great Auk: The Extinction of the Original Penguin. Bunker Hill.
- Fuller, Errol (2004). Mammoths: Giants of the Ice Age. Bunker Hill.
- Fuller, Errol (2004). Lost Worlds. Doha, Qatar: National Council for Culture, Arts and Heritage. ISBN 99921-58-29-8
- Fuller, Errol (2009). Dana Quarry and Its Dinosaurs. Dinosauria International. ISBN 978-0-9533553-3-4.
- Fuller, Errol (2010). Hedley Fitton: The Accent of Truth. Southern Cross the Dog Publishing. ISBN 978-0-9533553-2-7
- Attenborough, David and Fuller, Errol (2012). Drawn from Paradise: The Discovery, Art and Natural History of the Birds of Paradise. HarperCollins, UK. ISBN 978-0-00-748761-5
- Fuller, Errol (2013). Lost Animals: Extinction and the Photographic Record. Bloomsbury. ISBN 978-1408172155
- Fuller, Errol (2014). Voodoo Salon Taxidermy. Stacey International. ISBN 978-1909022447
- Fuller, Errol (2014). The Passenger Pigeon. Princeton University Press. ISBN 978-0691162959

== Magazine articles ==
- Fuller, Errol (April 1998). "Voyage of a Painter." Natural History (New York), pp. 12–14.

== Filmography ==
Date	Title	Role	Notes
16 October 2001	Extinct (UK Channel 4)	Himself	Episode 4 (of 6): "The Great Auk"
4 November 2007	The Dodo's Guide to Surviving Extinction (UK BBC Four)	Himself	A TV programme shown as part of a night of programming dedicated to extinction.
13 April 2010	The One Show (UK BBC One)	Himself	
28 June 2012	Four Rooms (UK Channel 4)	Himself	Series 1 Episode 6

== Paintings ==
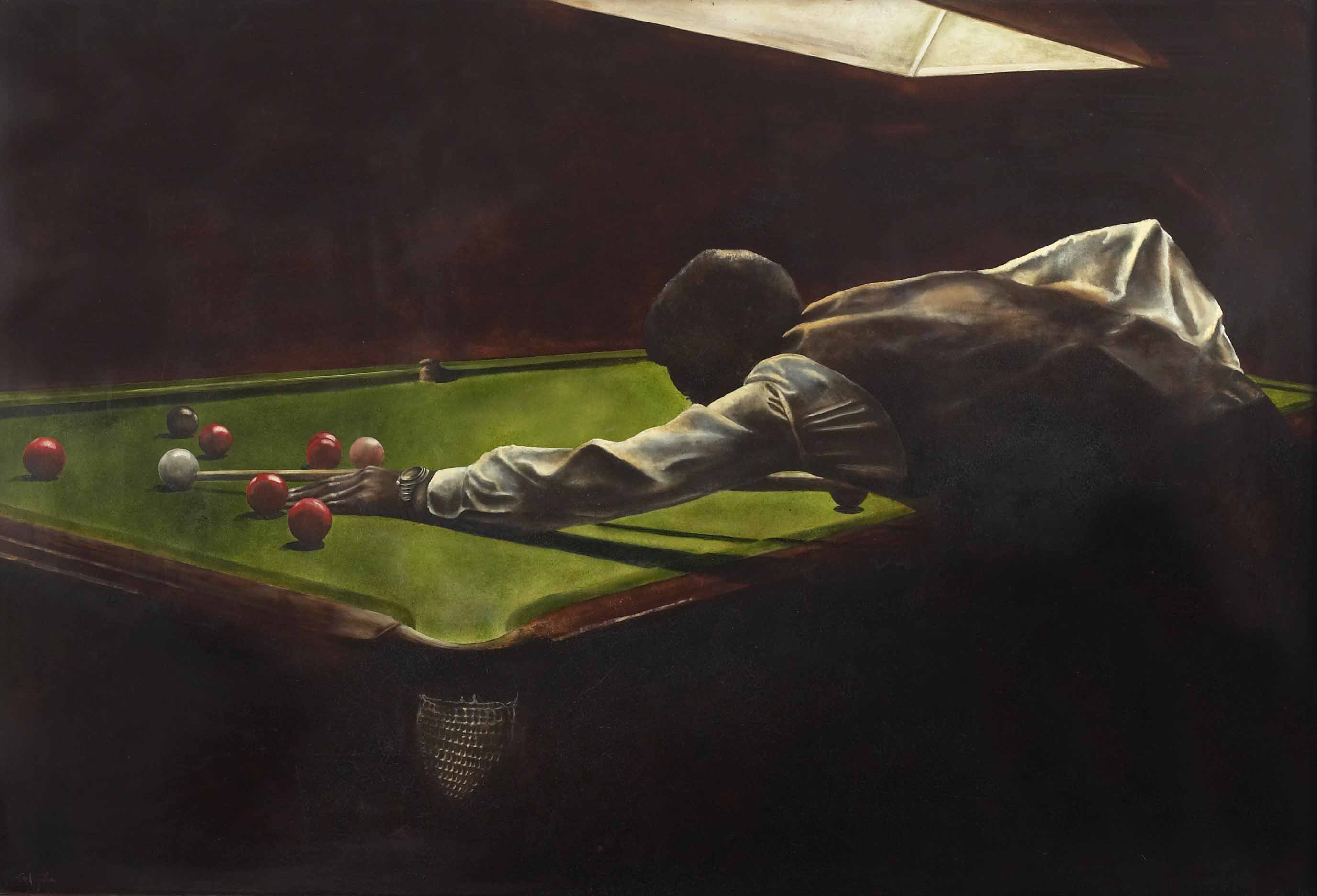
John the Revelator – painting by Errol Fuller

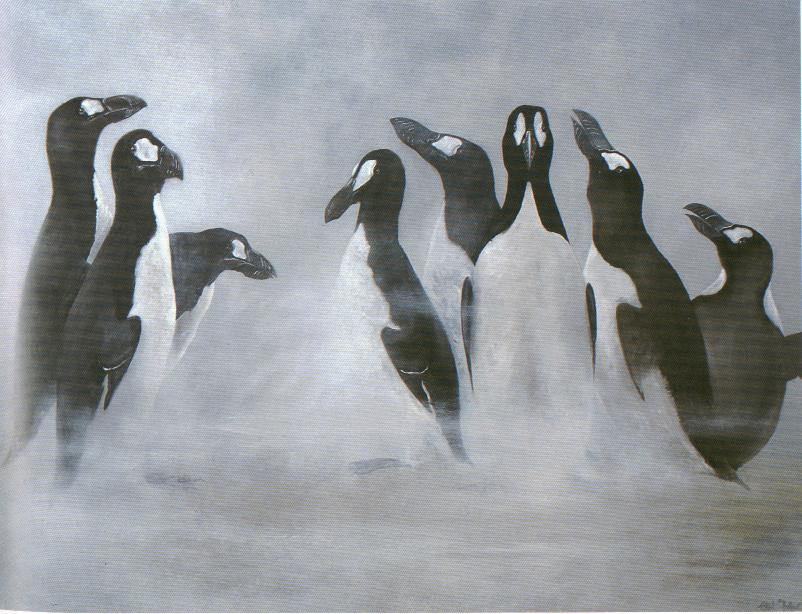
A Last Stand – painting of Great Auks by Errol Fuller

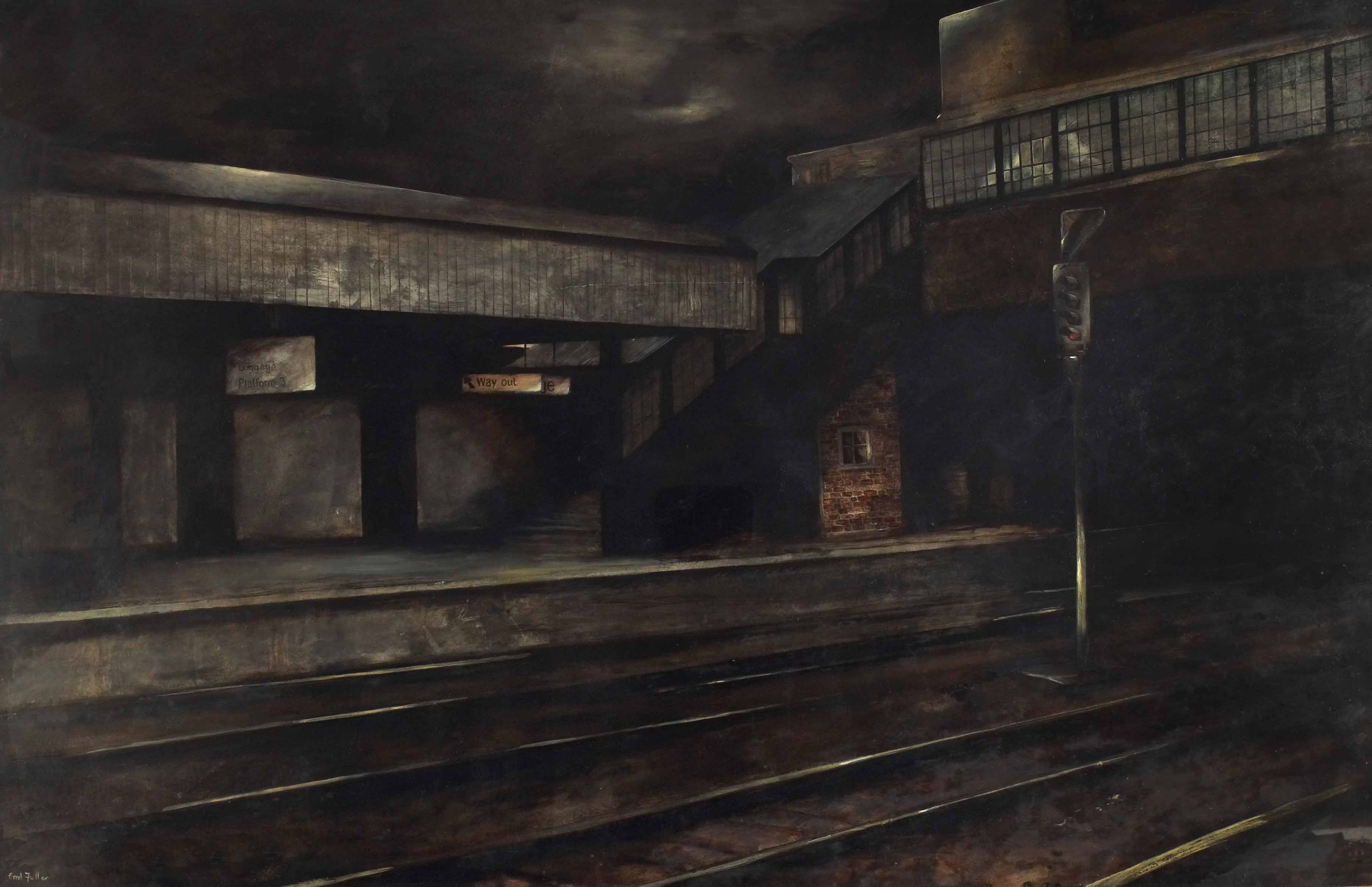
The Lurker in the Dark – painting by Errol Fuller

== See also ==
- Extinct Birds (Rothschild book)
- Great auk
- Dodo
- Bird-of-paradise
