= Kanaka pigeon =

Kanaka pigeon Temporal range: Holocene

Conservation status
- Extinct (~2500 BP)

Scientific classification
- Kingdom: Animalia
- Phylum: Chordata
- Class: Aves
- Order: Columbiformes
- Family: Columbidae
- Genus: Caloenas
- Species: †C. canacorum

Binomial name
- †Caloenas canacorum Balouet & Olson, 1989

Extinct species of bird

The Kanaka pigeon (Caloenas canacorum), also known as the great green pigeon or greater maned pigeon, is an extinct species of pigeon. It was probably hunted to extinction by the early settlers of New Caledonia and Tonga around 2,500 years ago. It was described from subfossil remains found at the Pindai Caves of New Caledonia. The specific epithet is a Latinisation of kanaka, the name of the native Melanesian people of New Caledonia. It was about 25% larger than its closest living relative, the Nicobar pigeon.
