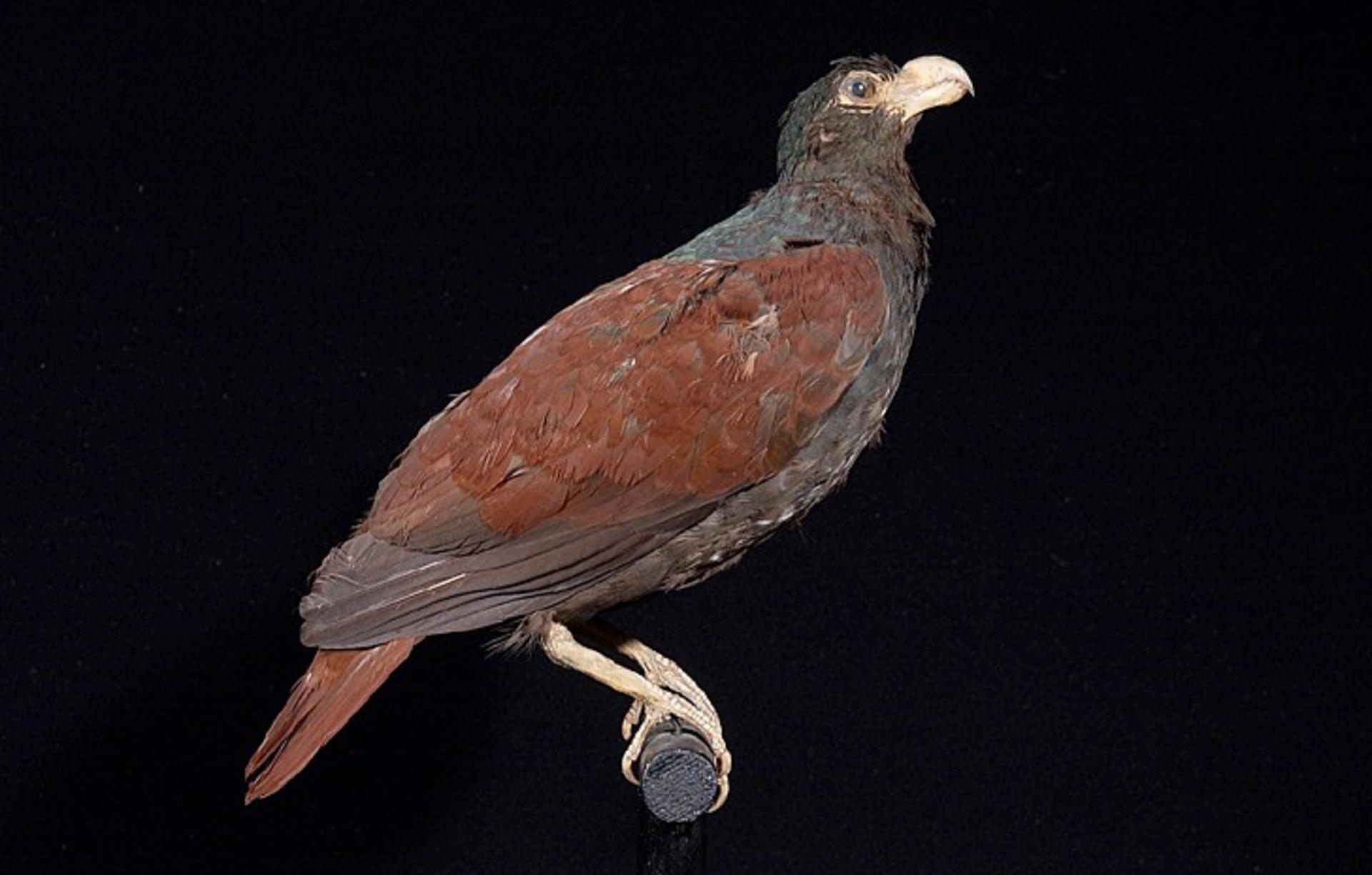
- Mounted specimen at the Naturalis Biodiversity Center

Conservation status
- Critically Endangered (IUCN 3.1)

Scientific classification
- Kingdom: Animalia
- Phylum: Chordata
- Class: Aves
- Order: Columbiformes
- Family: Columbidae
- Genus: Didunculus
- Species: D. strigirostris

Binomial name
- Didunculus strigirostris (Jardine, 1845)

= Tooth-billed pigeon =

Species of bird

The tooth-billed pigeon (Didunculus strigirostris), also known as the manumea, is a large pigeon endemic to Samoa. It is the only living species of genus Didunculus. The tooth-billed pigeon is the national bird of Samoa and featured on the 20 tālā bills and the 50 sene pieces of the 2008/2011 series. Native only to Samoa's primary rainforest, it is considered to be endangered, with only a few hundred individuals thought to remain in existence.

== Description ==
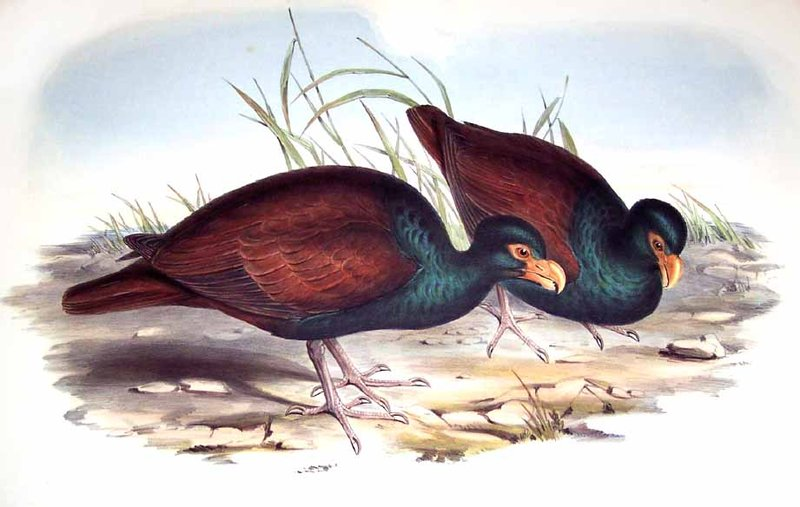
Illustration by John Gould (probably from stuffed specimens)

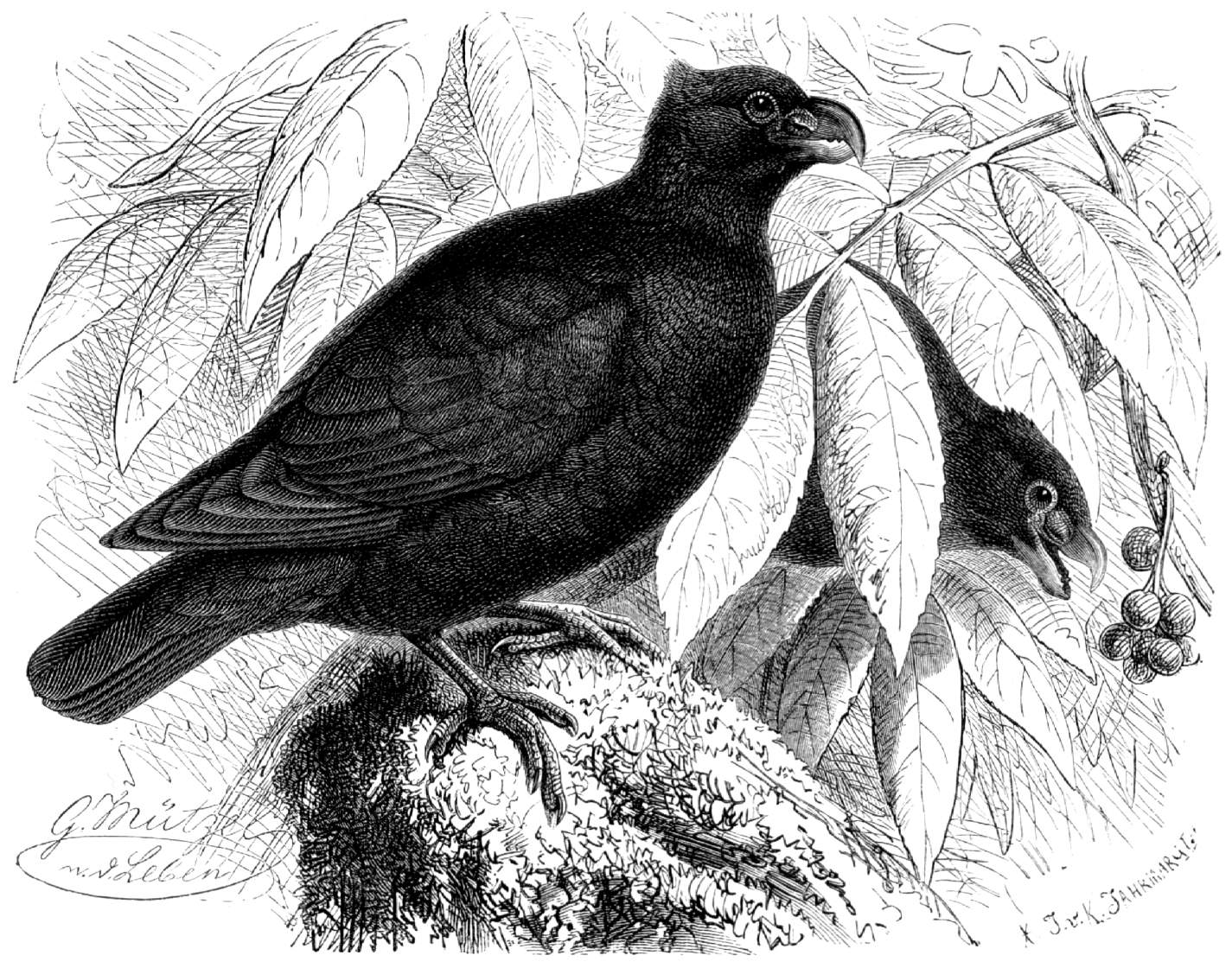
Illustration in habitat by Gustav Mützel

The tooth-billed pigeon is a medium-sized, approximately 31 centimetres (12 in) long, dark pigeon with reddish feet and red bare skin around the eye. The underparts, head and neck are greyish with a slight blue-green iridescence, and the tail, wings-coverts and tertials are rufous chestnut, while the remaining remiges are blackish. It has a large, curved, and hooked bright red bill, with tooth-like projections on the lower mandible which let them act as seed dispensers. The sexes are similar in appearance, but the juvenile is duller, with a browner head, and a black bill with pale orange at the base. Behaviourally, it is unusual – perhaps unique among members of Columbiformes in drinking by scooping water up in its bill, in the manner of the great majority of bird species, rather than sucking it up using the tongue as a straw.

== Taxonomy and systematics ==
The species was likely discovered on October or November 1839, by the United States' Exploring Expedition under Commander Wilkes. The discovery of the bird was announced by Hugh Edwin Strickland in September 1844 as being among the rarities obtained by Mr. Titian Peale, the naturalist of the expedition. The formal description was made by William Jardine (Ann. Nat. Hist. xvi. p. 175, plate 9), under the name of Gnathodon strigirostris, although that genus name was already in use for a mollusc.

It has no close living relative, but it has been shown to be genetically close to the dodo, and the genus name Didunculus means "little dodo". the English name of dodlet was suggested by Sir Richard Owen. The jaw and tongue structure, and the superficially parrotlike bill have suggested a relationship to the parrots, but these features have arisen from its specialised diet rather than any real relationship.

The following cladogram, from Shapiro and colleagues (2002), shows the tooth-billed pigeon as the basal member of the clade and closest relationships within Columbidae, a clade consisting of generally ground-dwelling island endemics of which the Dodo is the most prominent.

- - Didunculus strigirostris (tooth-billed pigeon)
  - - Goura victoria (Victoria crowned pigeon)
    - - - - Caloenas nicobarica (Nicobar pigeon)
          - - †Pezophaps solitaria (Rodrigues solitaire)
            - †Raphus cucullatus (dodo)

A similar cladogram was published in 2007, differing only in the inverted placement of Goura and Didunculus, as well as in the inclusion of the pheasant pigeon and the thick-billed ground pigeon at the base of the clade.

== Distribution and habitat ==
The tooth-billed pigeon is confined to undisturbed forests of both the islands of Samoa in the Pacific. It is only found on three islands, Savai'i, Upolu, and Nu'utele. It lives away from sea level on its main food source, the fruits of two species of Dysoxylum, a tree in the mahogany family, though baby chicks are unable to do so.

== Threats ==
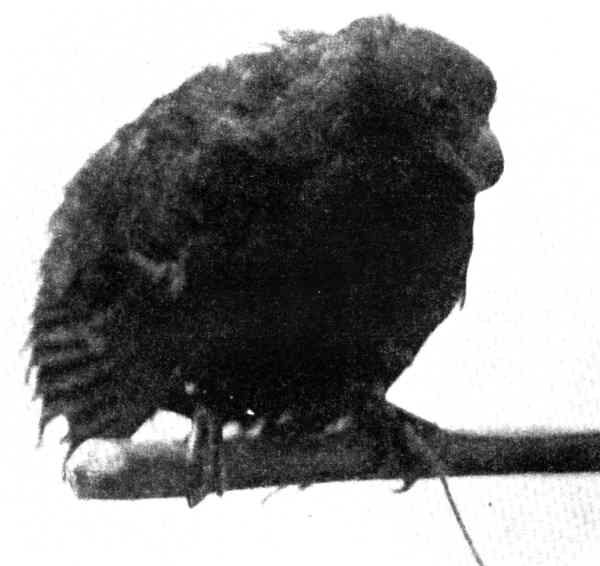
Live specimen, 1901

The Tooth billed pigeon is critically endangered by the IUCN Red List. The bird is threatened by habitat destruction, hunting, and invasive animals. In the 1990s, the population of the tooth billed pigeon was 7,000. Two major cyclones destroyed most of its natural habitat, so the population decreased to 2500. A recovery search in 2006 then documented a population of 500. It is suggested that the population of mature individuals is now under 200. The bird was used as a source of food, as well as its feathers used to make fine mats. The last confirmed photo was of a juvenile in 2013.

In 2020 the bird was both heard and seen during a survey of forests on Savai'i.

== Bibliography ==
- Gibbs, David (2010). Pigeons and Doves: A Guide to the Pigeons and Doves of the World. Bloomsbury Publishing Plc. ISBN 978-1-4081-3556-3.
