= Keuper marl =

Keuper marl is a former and now deprecated term for multiple layers of mudstone and siltstone of Triassic age which occur beneath parts of the English Midlands and neighbouring areas e.g. Cheshire, Nottinghamshire, Devon, eastern Worcestershire and northern Yorkshire.

Typically red, or occasionally green or grey, these strata are generally featureless and contain few fossils. In basin formations, thick halite-bearing layers, or rock salt deposits, are sometimes present at the base of the marl.

In modern nomenclature, Keuper marl is included within the Mercia Mudstone Group.
