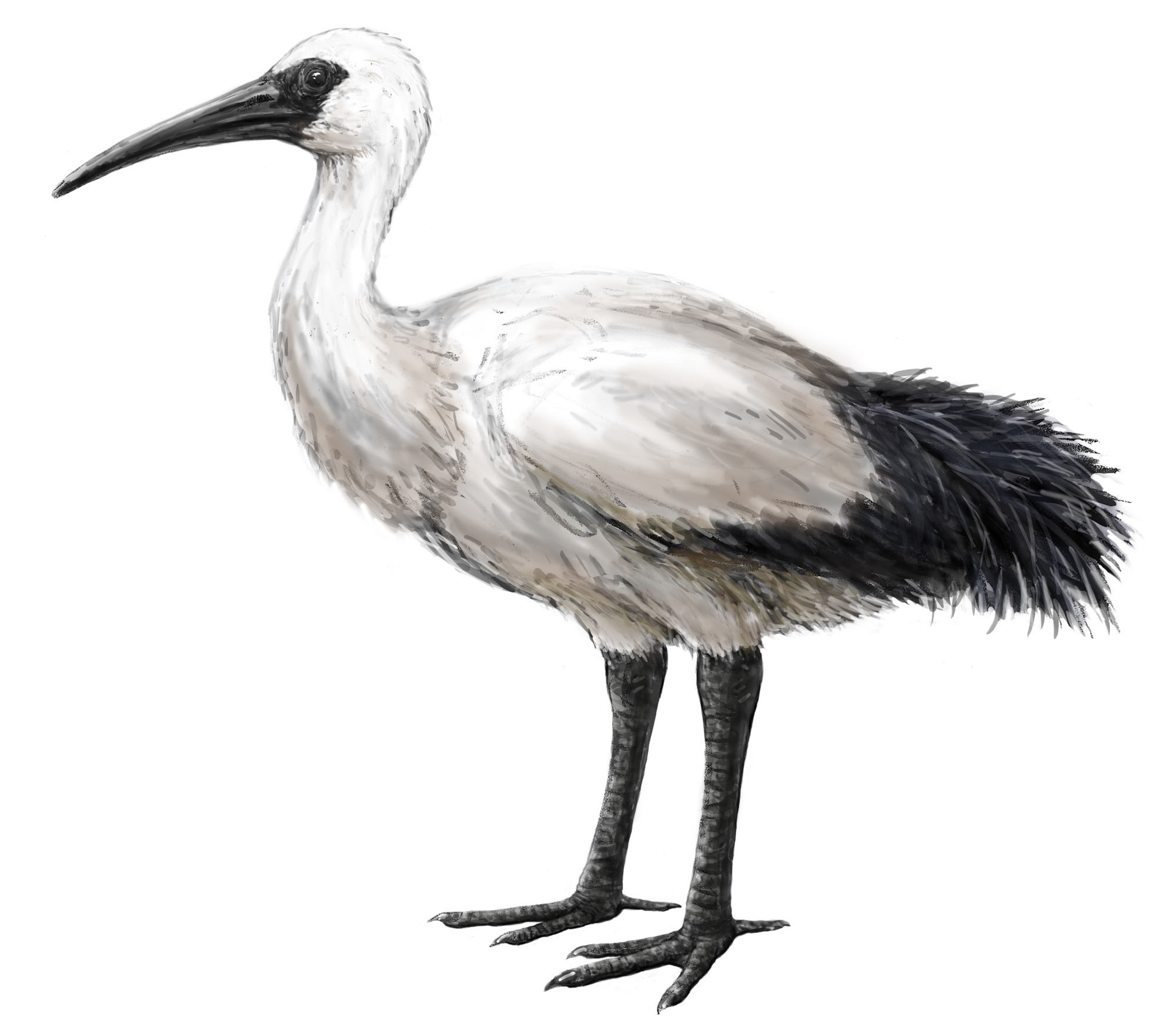
- Hypothetical restoration based on contemporary descriptions, subfossil remains, and extant relatives

Conservation status
- Extinct (early 18th century) (IUCN 3.1)

Scientific classification
- Kingdom: Animalia
- Phylum: Chordata
- Class: Aves
- Order: Pelecaniformes
- Family: Threskiornithidae
- Genus: Threskiornis
- Species: †T. solitarius

Binomial name
- †Threskiornis solitarius (de Sélys-Longchamps, 1848)
- Location of Réunion (encircled)

Synonyms
- List: Apterornis solitarius Sélys, 1848; Raphus solitarius Sélys, 1848; Didus apterornis (Schlegel, 1854); Pezophaps borbonica Bonaparte, 1854; Ornithaptera borbonica (Bonaparte, 1854); Apterornis solitaria (Milne-Edwards, 1869); Didus borbonica (Schlegel, 1873); Didus borbonicus (Schlegel, 1875); Ornithaptera solitarius (Hachisuka, 1953); Victoriornis imperialis Hachisuka, 1937; Borbonibis latipes Mourer & Moutou, 1987

= Réunion ibis =

Extinct bird that was endemic to Réunion

The Réunion ibis or Réunion sacred ibis (Threskiornis solitarius) is an extinct species of ibis that was endemic to the volcanic island of Réunion in the Indian Ocean. The first subfossil remains were found in 1974, and the ibis was first scientifically described in 1987. Its closest relatives are the Malagasy sacred ibis, the African sacred ibis, and the straw-necked ibis. Travellers' accounts from the 17th and 18th centuries described a white bird on Réunion that flew with difficulty and preferred solitude, which was subsequently referred to as the "Réunion solitaire".

In the mid 19th century the old travellers' accounts were incorrectly assumed to refer to white relatives of the dodo. This was assumed because one of the accounts specifically mentioned dodos on the island, and 17th-century paintings of white dodos had recently surfaced. Additionally, both it and the Rodrigues solitaire, an actual dodo relative, were referred to as "solitaires" due to shared habits. However, no fossils referable to dodo-like birds were ever found on Réunion, and it was later questioned whether the paintings had anything to do with the island. Other identities were suggested as well, based only on speculations. In the late 20th century, the discovery of ibis subfossils led to the idea that the old accounts actually referred to an ibis species instead. The idea that the "solitaire" and the subfossil ibis are identical was met with limited dissent, but is now widely accepted.

Combined, the old descriptions and subfossils show that the Réunion ibis was mainly white, with this colour merging into yellow and grey. The wing tips and plumes of ostrich-like feathers on its rear were black. The neck and legs were long, and the beak was relatively straight and short for an ibis. It was more robust in build than its extant relatives, but was otherwise quite similar to them. It would have been no longer than 65 cm (25 in) in length. Subfossil wingbones indicate it had reduced flight capabilities, a feature perhaps linked to seasonal fattening. The diet of the Réunion ibis was worms and other items foraged from the soil. In the 17th century, it lived in mountainous areas, but it may have been confined to these remote heights by heavy hunting by humans and predation by introduced animals in the more accessible areas of the island. Visitors to Réunion praised its flavour, and therefore sought after its flesh. These factors are believed to have driven the Réunion ibis to extinction by the early 18th century.

== Taxonomy ==
The taxonomic history of the Réunion ibis is convoluted and complex, due to the ambiguous and meagre evidence that was available to scientists until the late 20th century. The supposed "white dodo" of Réunion is now believed to have been an erroneous conjecture based on the few contemporary reports which described the Réunion ibis, combined with paintings of white dodos from Mauritius by the Dutch painters Pieter Withoos and Pieter Holsteyn II (and derivatives) from the 17th century that surfaced in the 19th century.

=== Contemporary accounts ===
The English Chief Officer John Tatton was the first to mention a specifically white bird on Réunion, in 1625. The French occupied the island from 1646 and onwards, and referred to this bird as the "solitaire". M. Carré of the French East India Company described the "solitaire" in 1699, explaining the reason for its name:

I saw a kind of bird in this place which I have not found elsewhere; it is that which the inhabitants call the Oiseaux Solitaire for to be sure, it loves solitude and only frequents the most secluded places; one never sees two or more together; it is always alone. It is not unlike a turkey, if it did not have longer legs. The beauty of its plumage is a delight to see. It is of changeable colour which verges upon yellow. The flesh is exquisite; it forms one of the best dishes in this country, and might form a dainty at our tables. We wished to keep two of these birds to send to France and present them to His Majesty, but as soon as they were on board ship, they died of melancholy, having refused to eat or drink.

François Leguat, a marooned French Huguenot, used the name "solitaire" for the Rodrigues solitaire, a Raphine bird (related to the dodo) he encountered on the nearby island of Rodrigues in the 1690s, but it is thought he borrowed the name from a 1689 tract by Marquis Henri Duquesne which mentioned the Réunion species. Duquesne himself had probably based his own description on an earlier one. No specimens of the "solitaire" were ever preserved.

The two individuals Carré attempted to send to the royal menagerie in France did not survive in captivity. Billiard claimed that the French administrator Bertrand-François Mahé de La Bourdonnais sent a "solitaire" to France from Réunion around 1740. Since the Réunion ibis is believed to have gone extinct by this date, the bird may actually have been a Rodrigues solitaire.

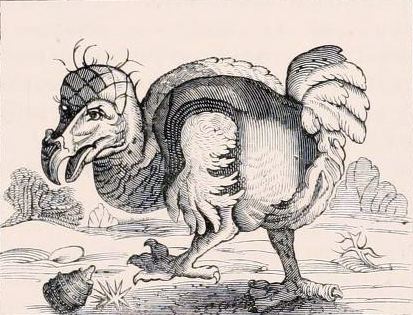
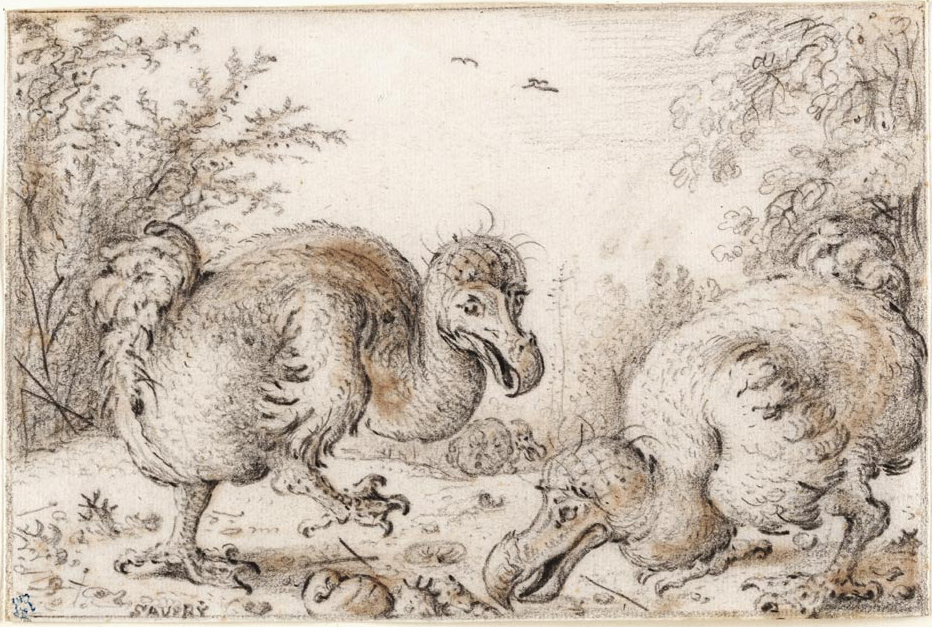
1646 etching of a dodo that Willem Ysbrandtszoon Bontekoe claimed to have seen on Réunion (left), and Roelandt Savery's sketch of three dodos from c. 1626 (right); the etching used by Bontekoe was derived from the dodo on the left

The only contemporary writer who referred specifically to "dodos" inhabiting Réunion was the Dutch sailor Willem Ysbrandtszoon Bontekoe, though he did not mention their colouration:

There were also Dod-eersen [old Dutch for dodos], which have small wings, and so far from being able to fly, they were so fat that they could scarcely walk, and when they tried to run, they dragged their under side along the ground.

When his journal was published in 1646, it was accompanied by an engraving which is now known to have been copied after one of the dodos in the Flemish painter Roelant Savery's "Crocker Art Gallery sketch". Since Bontekoe was shipwrecked and lost all his belongings after visiting Réunion in 1619, he may not have written his account until he returned to Holland, seven years later, which would put its reliability in question. He may have concluded in hindsight that it was a dodo, finding what he saw similar to accounts of that bird.

=== Early interpretation ===
In the 1770s, the French naturalist Comte de Buffon stated that the dodo inhabited both Mauritius and Réunion for unclear reasons. He also combined accounts about the Rodrigues solitaire and a bird from Mauritius ("oiseau de Nazareth", now thought to be a dodo), as well as the "solitaire" Carré reported from Réunion under one "solitaire" section, indicating he believed there was both a dodo and "solitaire" on Réunion. The English naturalist Hugh Edwin Strickland discussed the old descriptions of the "solitaire" in his 1848 book The Dodo and Its Kindred, and concluded it was distinct from the dodo and Rodrigues solitaire due to its colouration.

The Belgian scientist Edmond de Sélys Longchamps coined the scientific name Apterornis solitarius for the "solitaire" in 1848, apparently making it the type species of the genus, in which he also included two other Mascarene birds only known from contemporary accounts, the red rail and the Réunion swamphen. As the name Apterornis had already been used for a different bird by the English biologist Richard Owen, and the other former names were likewise invalid, Bonaparte coined the new binomial Ornithaptera borbonica in 1854 (Bourbon was the original French name for Réunion). In 1854, the German ornithologist Hermann Schlegel placed the "solitaire" in the same genus as the dodo, and named it Didus apterornis. He restored it strictly according to contemporary accounts, which resulted in an ibis or stork-like bird instead of a dodo.

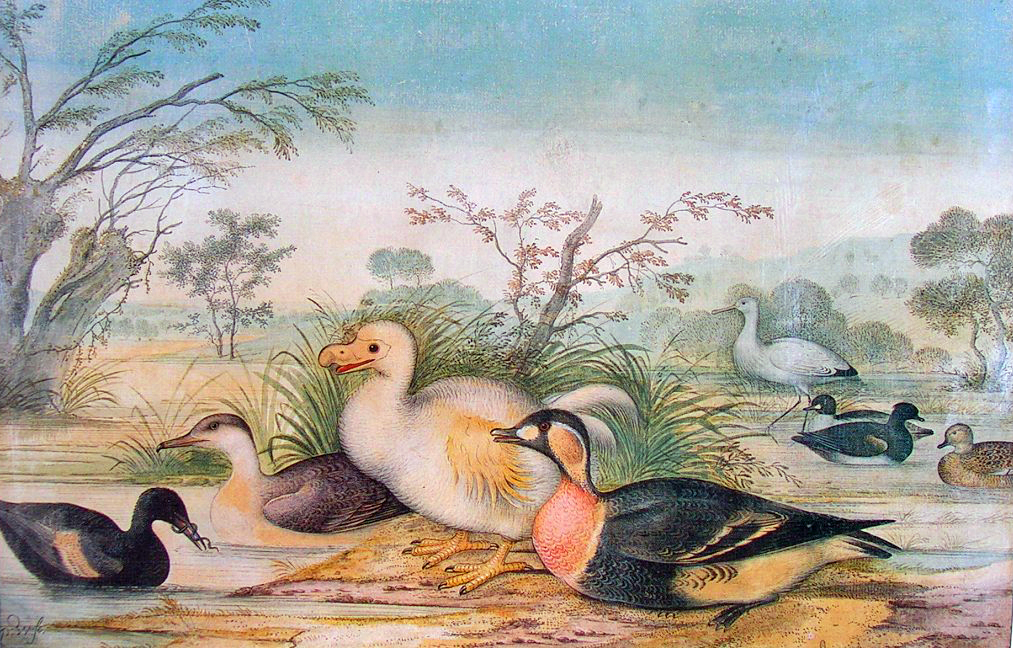
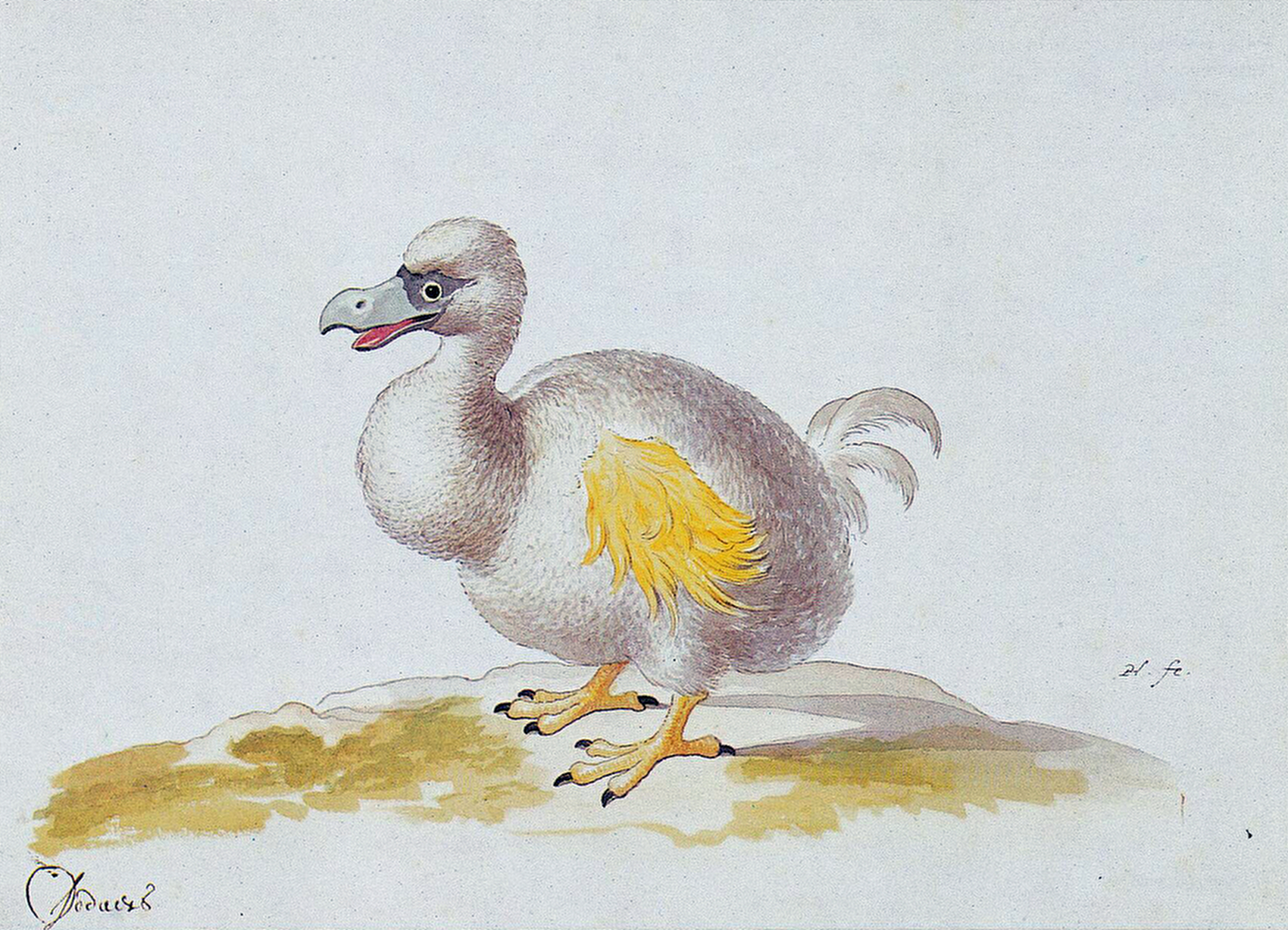
Pieter Withoos's late 17th-century painting of a white dodo among other birds, the first of such paintings to be discovered (left), and one of Pieter Holsteyn II's mid-17th-century paintings of a white dodo

In 1856, William Coker announced the discovery of a 17th-century "Persian" painting of a white dodo among waterfowl, which he had been shown in England. The artist was later identified as Pieter Withoos, and many prominent 19th-century naturalists subsequently assumed the image depicted the white "solitaire" of Réunion, a possibility originally proposed by ornithologist John Gould. Simultaneously, several similar paintings of white dodos by Pieter Holsteyn II were discovered in the Netherlands. Other paintings and drawings were also later identified as showing white dodos. In 1869, the English ornithologist Alfred Newton argued that the Withoos' painting and engraving in Bontekoe's memoir depicted a living Réunion dodo that had been brought to Holland, while explaining its blunt beak as a result of beak trimming to prevent it from injuring humans. He also brushed aside the inconsistencies between the illustrations and descriptions, especially the long, thin beak implied by one contemporary account.

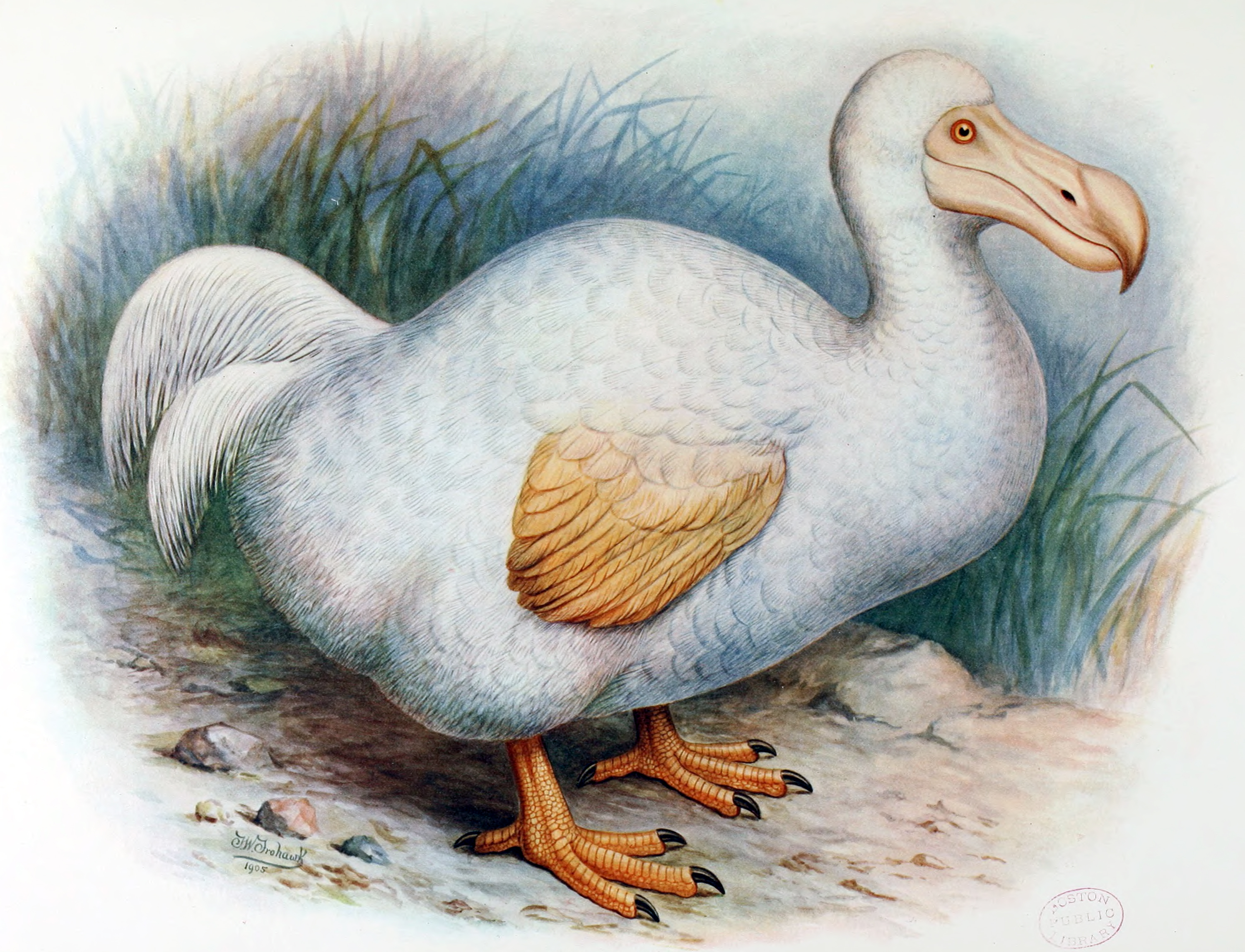
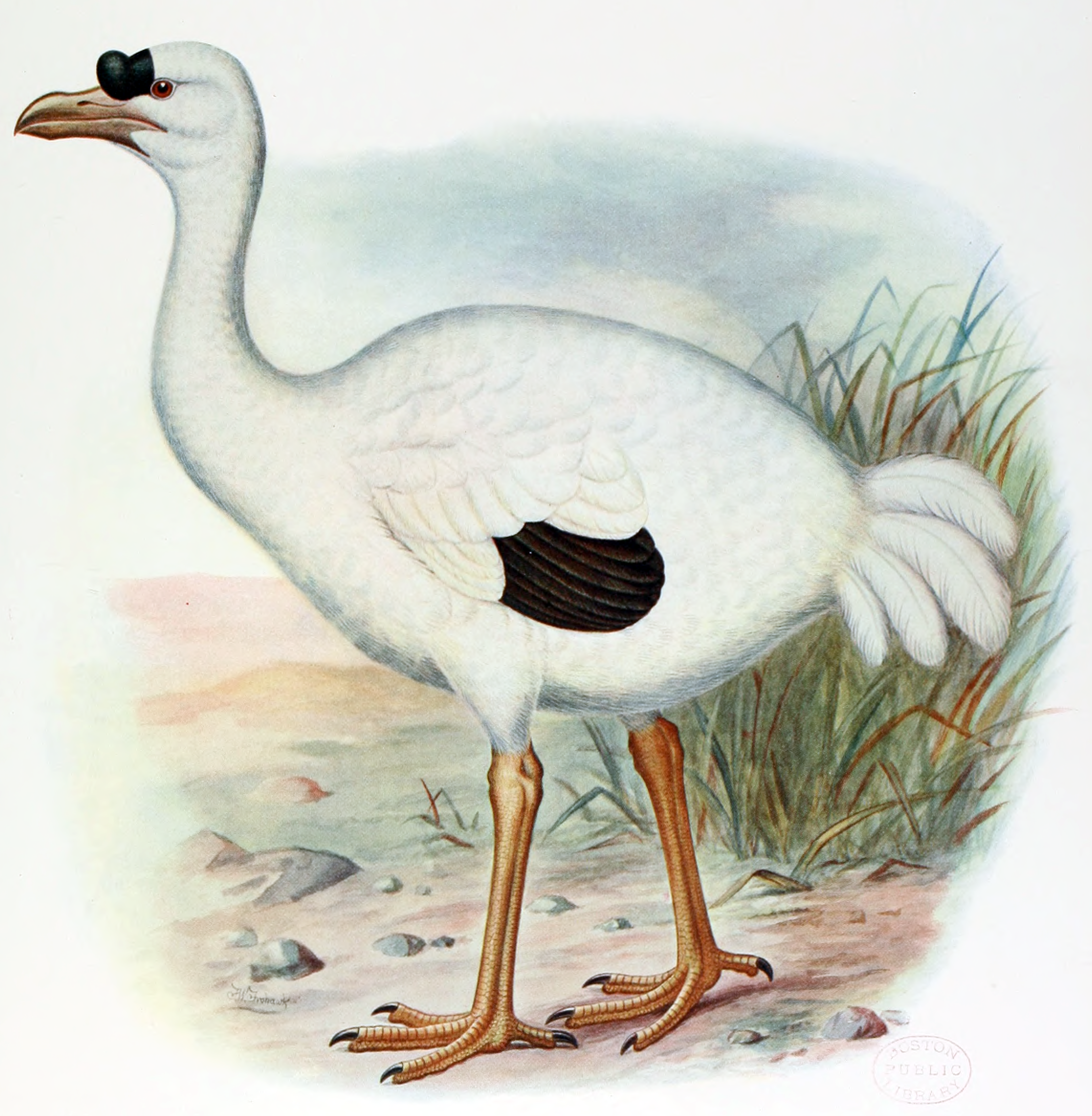
Frederick William Frohawk's 1907 restoration of the "solitaire" (left), adapted from Withoos' white dodo, and his alternate restoration (right), based on Sieur Dubois' description

Newton's words particularly cemented the validity of this connection among contemporary peers, and several of them expanded on his views. The Dutch zoologist Anthonie Cornelis Oudemans suggested in 1917 that the discrepancies between the paintings and the old descriptions were due to the paintings showing a female, and that the species was, therefore, sexually dimorphic. The British zoologist Walter Rothschild claimed in 1907 that the yellow wings might have been due to albinism in this particular specimen, since the old descriptions described these as black.

By the early 20th century, many other paintings and even physical remains were claimed to be of white dodos, amid much speculation. Rothschild commissioned British artist Frederick William Frohawk to restore the "solitaire" as both a white dodo, based on the Withoos painting, and as a distinct bird based on the French traveller Sieur Dubois' 1674 description, for his 1907 book Extinct Birds. In 1937, the Japanese writer Masauji Hachisuka suggested that the old accounts and paintings represented two different species, and referred to the white dodos of the paintings as Victoriornis imperialis (honouring King Victor Emmanuel III of Italy), and the "solitaire" of the accounts as Ornithaptera solitarius (using the generic name coined by Bonaparte). Hachisuka also suggested that a 1618 Italian illustration previously identified as a dodo being hunted, actually showed a male, brown Réunion solitaire (he ruled out Rodrigues because that island was not yet inhabited at the time). To him, this cleared up the confusion between the two species, which is why he named the white dodo for the King of Italy (the illustration being from Italy). Today the illustration is thought to depict an ostrich or a bustard.

=== Modern interpretation ===
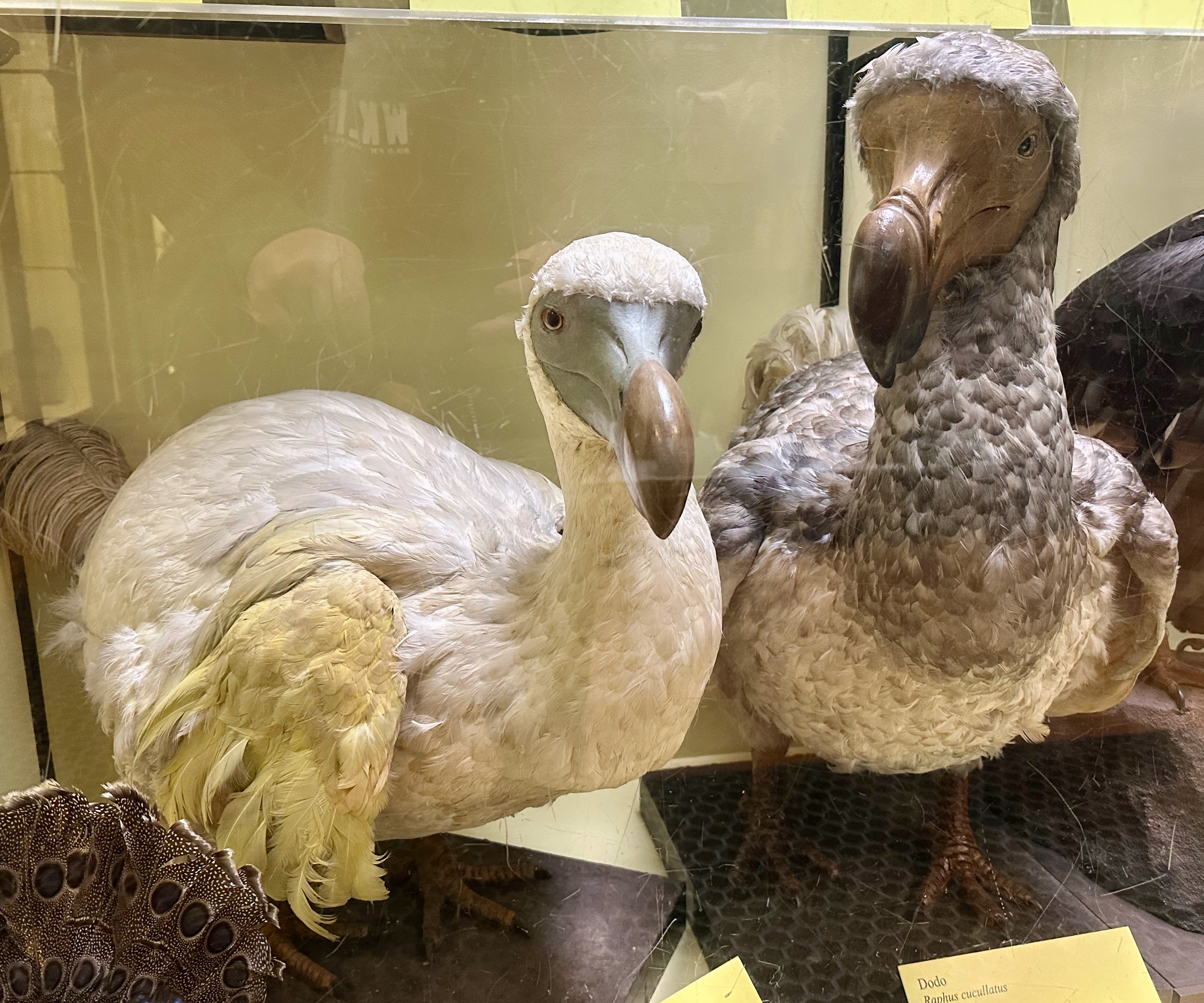
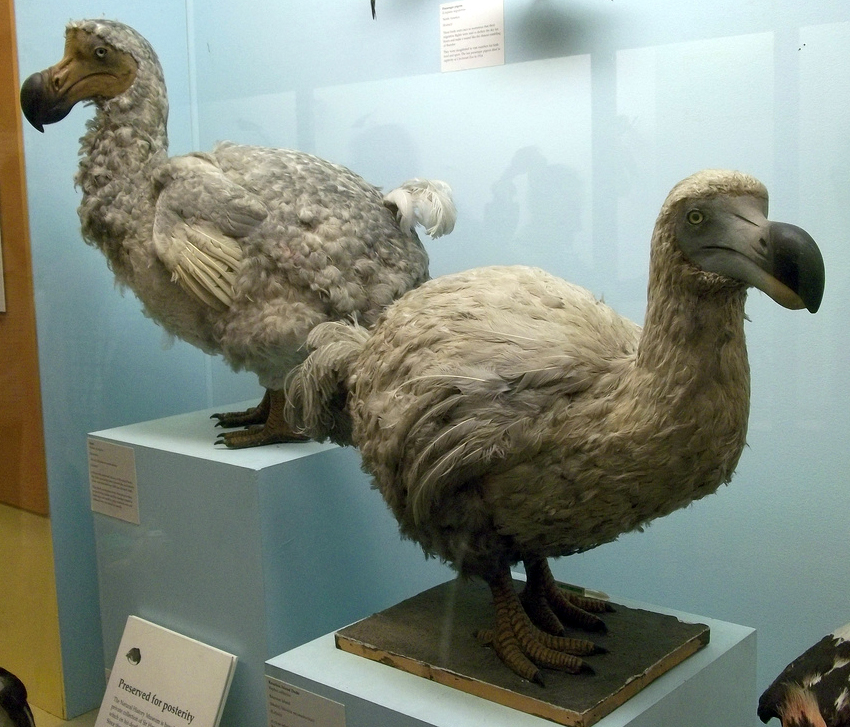
Rogue taxidermy of the supposed white dodo of Réunion and the dodo of Mauritius, in Natural History Museum at Tring (left) and Natural History Museum in London

Until the late 1980s, belief in the existence of a white dodo on Réunion was the orthodox view, and only a few researchers doubted the connection between the "solitaire" accounts and the dodo paintings. The American ornithologist James Greenway cautioned in 1958 that no conclusions could be made without solid evidence such as fossils, and that nothing indicated that the white dodos in the paintings had anything to do with Réunion. In 1970, the American ornithologist Robert W. Storer predicted that if any such remains were found, they would not belong to Raphinae like the dodo and Rodrigues solitaire (or even to the pigeon family like them).

The first subfossil bird remains on Réunion, the lower part of a tarsometatarsus, was found in 1974, and considered a new species of stork in the genus Ciconia by the British ornithologist Graham S. Cowles in 1987. The remains were found in a cave, which indicated it had been brought there and eaten by early settlers. It was speculated that the remains could have belonged to a large, mysterious bird described by Leguat, and called "Leguat's giant" by some ornithologists. "Leguat's giant" is now thought to be based on a locally extinct population of greater flamingos. Also in 1987, a subfossil tarsometatarsus of an ibis found in a cave was described as Borbonibis latipes (the specific name means "wide foot") by the French palaeontologists Cécile Mourer-Chauviré and François Moutou, and thought related to the bald ibises of the genus Geronticus.

Coats of arms of La Possession and Les Avirons based on this bird

In 1994, Cowles concluded that the "stork" remains he had reported belonged to Borbonibis, since their tarsometatarsi were similar. The 1987 discovery led the English biologist Anthony S. Cheke to suggest to one of the describers of Borbonibis that the subfossils may have been of the "solitaire". In 1995, the French ecologist Jean-Michel Probst reported his discovery of a bird mandible during an excavation on Réunion the former year, and suggested it may have belonged to the ibis or the "solitaire". In 1995, the describers of Borbonibis latipes suggested that it represented the "Réunion solitaire", and reassigned it to the ibis genus Threskiornis, now combined with the specific name solitarius from de Sélys-Longchamps' 1848 binomial for the "solitaire" (making Borbonibis latipes a junior synonym). The authors pointed out that the contemporary descriptions matched the appearance and behaviour of an ibis more than a member of the Raphinae, especially due to its comparatively short and straight mandible, and because ibis remains were abundant in some localities; it would be strange if contemporary writers never mentioned such a relatively common bird, whereas they mentioned most other species subsequently known from fossils.

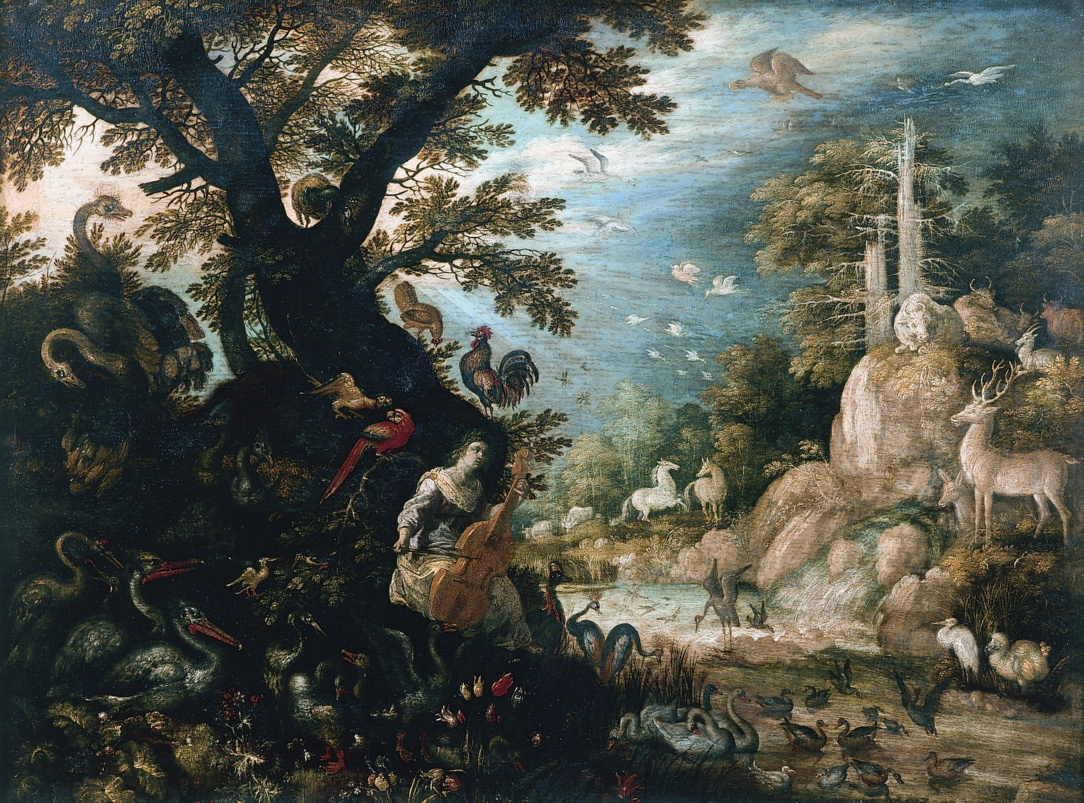
Roelant Savery painting with a whitish dodo in the lower right, 1611

The possible origin of the 17th-century white dodo paintings was examined, by the Spanish biologist Arturo Valledor de Lozoya in 2003, and independently by experts of Mascarene fauna Cheke and Julian Hume in 2004. The Withoos and Holsteyn paintings are clearly derived from each other, and Withoos likely copied his dodo from one of Holsteyn's works, since these were probably produced at an earlier date. All later white dodo pictures are thought to be based on these paintings. According to the aforementioned writers, it appears these pictures were themselves derived from a whitish dodo in a previously unreported painting called Landscape with Orpheus and the Animals, produced by Roelant Savery c. 1611. The dodo was apparently based on a stuffed specimen then in Prague; a walghvogel (old Dutch for dodo) described as having a "dirty off-white colouring" was mentioned in an inventory of specimens in the Prague collection of the Holy Roman Emperor Rudolf II to whom Savery was contracted at the time (1607–1611).

Savery's several later dodo images all show greyish birds, possibly because he had by then seen a normal specimen. Cheke and Hume concluded the painted specimen was white due to albinism, and that this peculiar feature was the reason it was collected from Mauritius and brought to Europe. Valledor de Lozoya instead suggested that the light plumage was a juvenile trait, a result of bleaching of old taxidermy specimens, or simply due to artistic license. In 2018, the British ornithologist Jolyon C. Parish and Cheke suggested that the painting was instead executed after 1614, or even after 1626, based on some of the motifs.

While many subfossil elements from throughout the skeleton have been assigned to the Réunion ibis, no remains of dodo-like birds have ever been found on Réunion. A few later sources have taken issue with the proposed ibis-identity of the "solitaire", and have even regarded the "white dodo" as a valid species. The British writer Errol Fuller agreed in 2002 that the 17th-century paintings do not depict Réunion birds, but has questioned whether the ibis subfossils are necessarily connected to the "solitaire" accounts. He notes that no evidence indicates the extinct ibis survived until the time Europeans reached Réunion. Cheke and Hume have dismissed such sentiments as being mere "belief" and "hope" in the existence of a dodo on the island.

=== Evolution ===
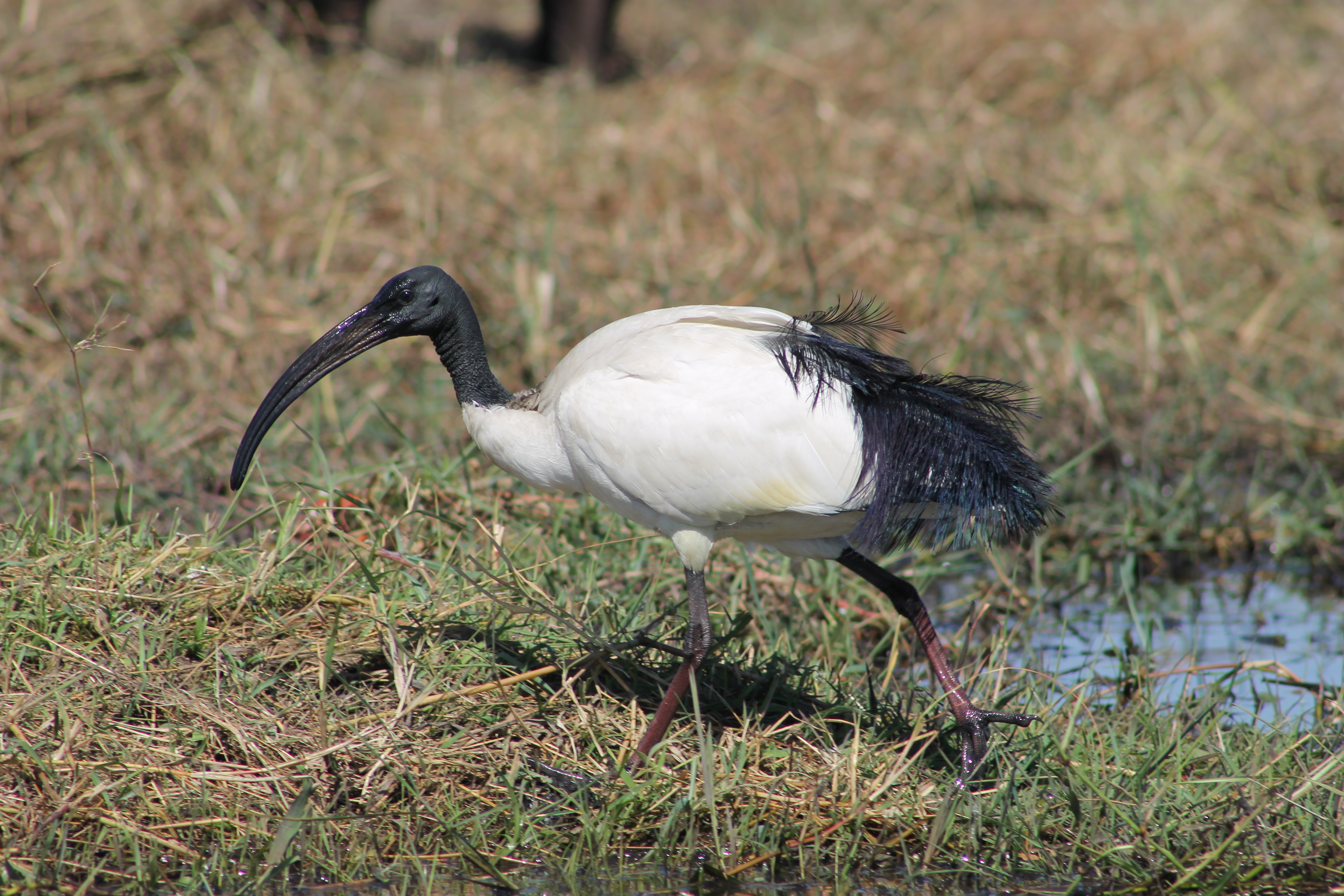
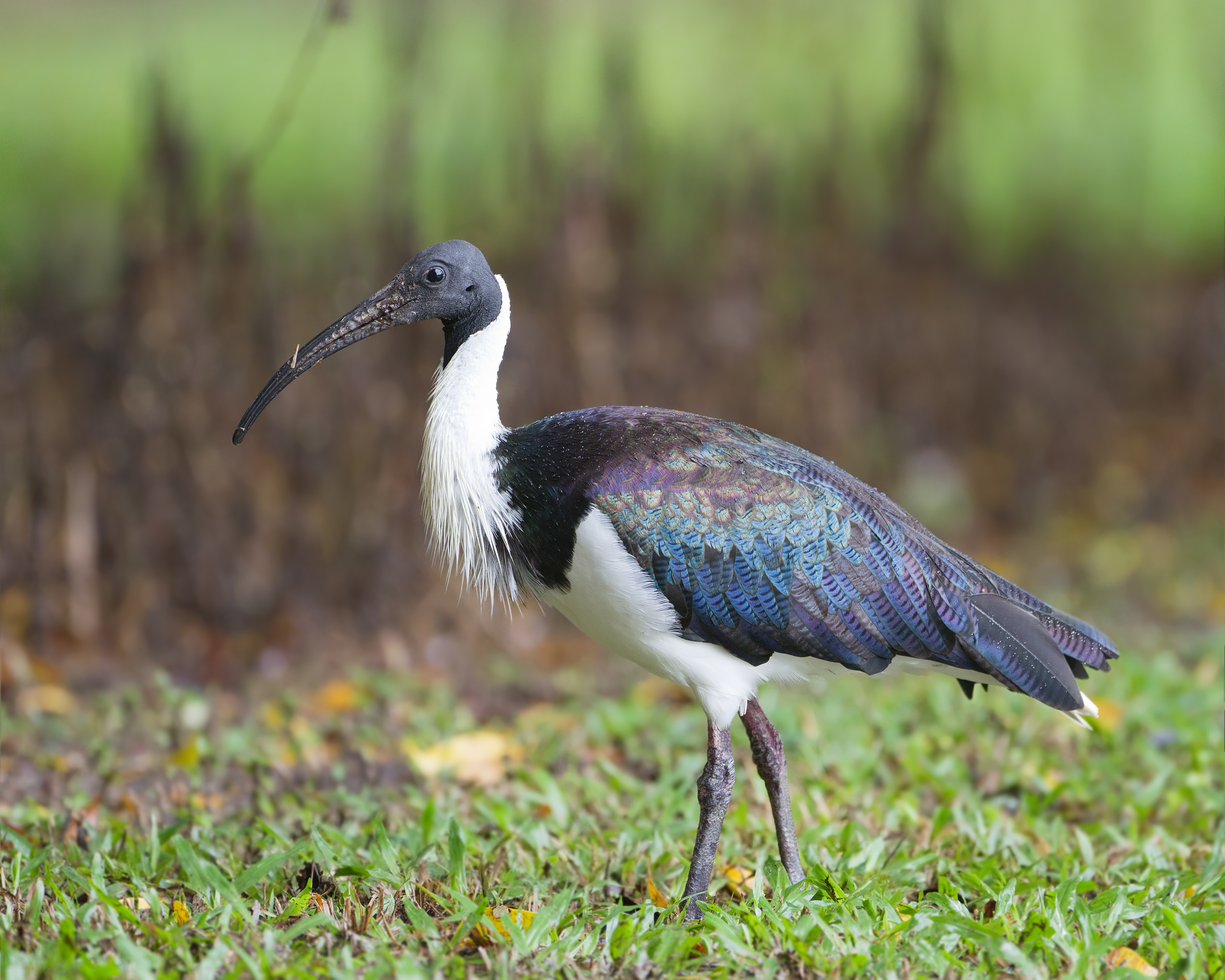
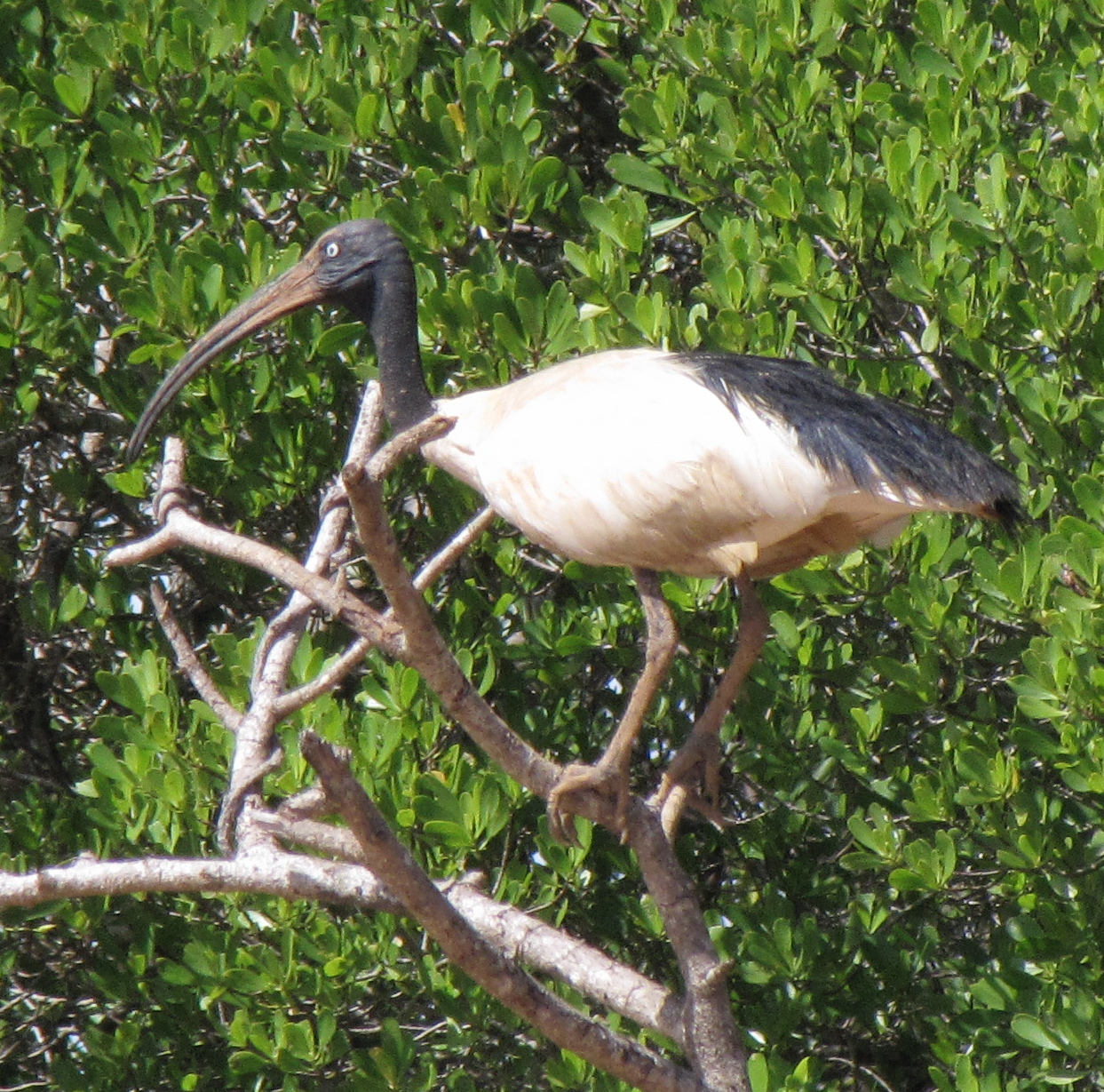
The African sacred ibis, straw-necked ibis, and Malagasy sacred ibis, three extant relatives in the genus Threskiornis

The volcanic island of Réunion is only three million years old, whereas Mauritius and Rodrigues, with each of their flightless Raphine species, are eight to ten million years old, and according to Cheke and Hume it is unlikely that either bird would have been capable of flying after five or more million years of adapting to the islands. Therefore, it is unlikely that Réunion could have been colonised by flightless birds from these islands, and only flighted species on the island have relatives there. Three million years is enough time for flightless and weak flying abilities to have evolved in bird species on Réunion itself, but Mourer-Chauviré and colleagues pointed out that such species would have been wiped out by the eruption of the volcano Piton des Neiges between 300,000 and 180,000 years ago. Most recent species would therefore likely be descendants of animals which had recolonised the island from Africa or Madagascar after this event, which is not enough time for a bird to become flightless.

In 1995, a morphological study by Mourer-Chauviré and colleagues suggested the closest extant relatives of the Réunion ibis are the African sacred ibis (T. aethiopicus) of Africa and the straw-necked ibis (T. spinicollis) of Australia. Cheke and Hume instead suggested that it was closest to the Malagasy sacred ibis (T. bernieri), and therefore of ultimately African origin.

== Description ==
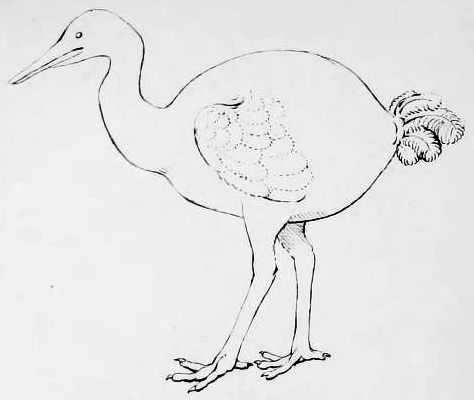
Hermann Schlegel's 1854 ibis or stork-like restoration, based on Dubois' description instead of as a dodo

Contemporary accounts described the species as having white and grey plumage merging into yellow, black wing tips and tail feathers, a long neck and legs, and limited flight capabilities. Dubois' 1674 account is the most detailed contemporary description of the bird, here as translated by Strickland in 1848:

Solitaires. These birds are so called because they always go alone. They are the size of a large Goose, and are white, with the tips of the wings and tail black. The tail feathers resemble those of an Ostrich; the neck is long, and the beak is like that of a Woodcock, but larger; the legs and feet like those of Turkeys. This bird has recourse to running, as it flies but very little.

According to Mourer-Chauviré and colleagues, the plumage colouration mentioned is similar to that of the related African sacred ibis and straw-necked ibis, which are also mainly white and glossy black. In the reproductive season, the ornamental feathers on the back and wing tips of the African sacred ibis look similar to the feathers of an ostrich, which echoes Dubois' description. Likewise, a subfossil lower jaw found in 1994 showed that the bill of the Réunion ibis was relatively short and straight for an ibis, which corresponds with Dubois' woodcock comparison. Cheke and Hume have suggested that the French word (bécasse) from Dubois' original description, usually translated to "woodcock", could also mean oystercatcher, another bird with a long, straight, but slightly more robust, bill. They have also pointed out that the last sentence is mistranslated, and actually means the bird could be caught by running after it. The bright colouration of the plumage mentioned by some authors may refer to iridescence, as seen in the straw-necked ibis.

Subfossils of the Réunion ibis show that it was more robust, likely much heavier, and had a larger head than the African sacred and straw-necked ibises. It was nonetheless similar to them in most features. According to Hume, it would have been no longer than 65 cm (25 in) in length, the size of the African sacred ibis. Rough protuberances on the wing bones of the Réunion ibis are similar to those of birds that use their wings in combat. It was perhaps flightless, but this has not left significant osteological traces; no complete skeletons have been collected, but of the known pectoral elements, only one feature indicates reduction in flight capability. The coracoid is elongated and the radius and ulna are robust, as in flighted birds, but a particular foramen (or opening) between a metacarpal and the alular is otherwise only known from flightless birds, such as some ratites, penguins, and several extinct species.

== Behaviour and ecology ==
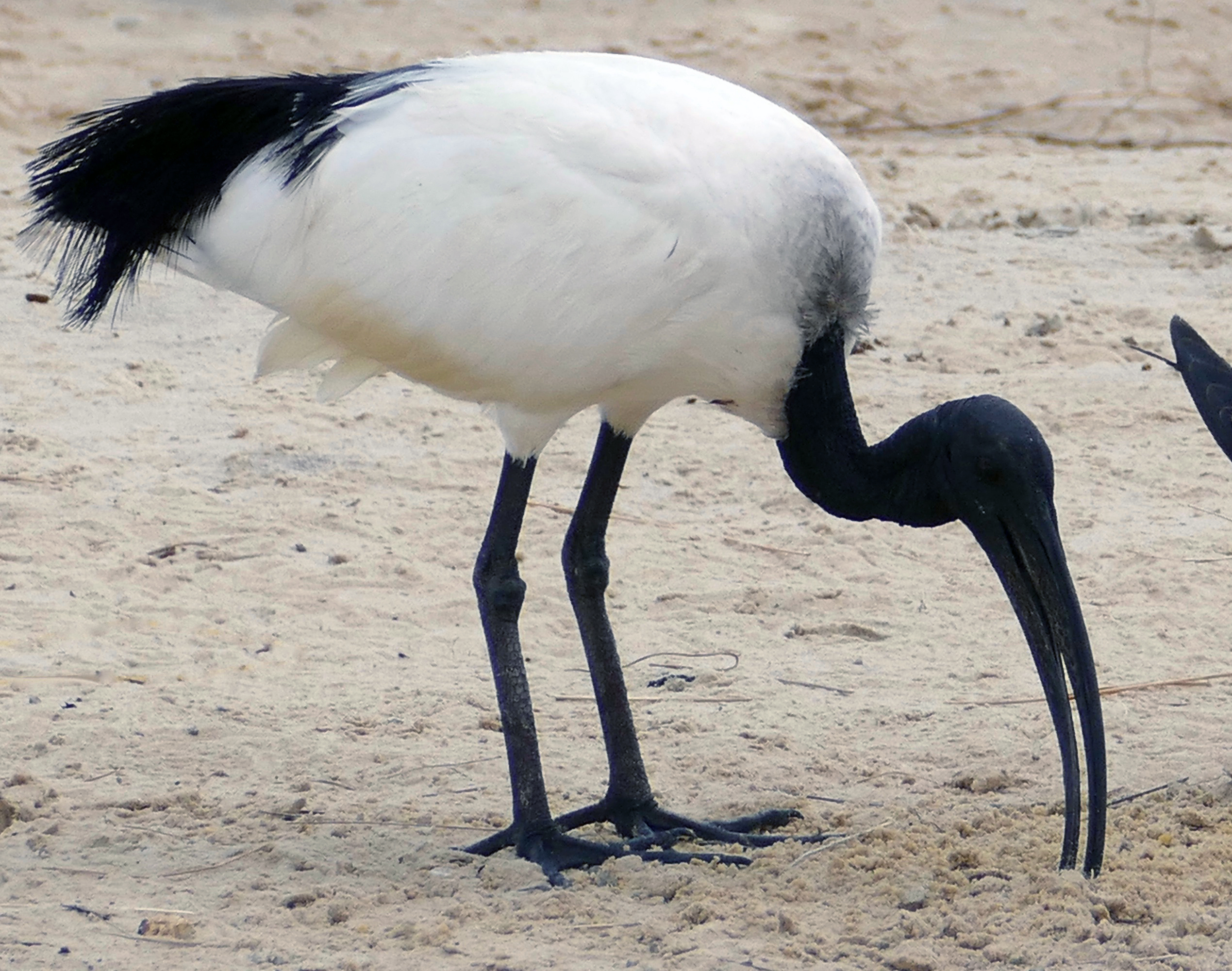
The Réunion ibis is said to have fed from soil, like this African sacred ibis

As contemporary accounts are inconsistent on whether the "solitaire" was flightless or had some flight capability, Mourer-Chauvire and colleagues suggested that this was dependent on seasonal fat-cycles, meaning that individuals fattened themselves during cool seasons, but were slim during hot seasons; perhaps it could not fly when it was fat, but could when it was not. However, Dubois specifically stated the "solitaires" did not have fat-cycles, unlike most other Réunion birds. The only mention of its diet and exact habitat is the account of the French cartographer Jean Feuilley from 1708, which is also the last record of a living individual:

The solitaires are the size of an average turkey cock, grey and white in colour. They inhabit the tops of mountains. Their food is only worms and filth, taken on or in the soil.

The diet and mode of foraging described by Feuilley matches that of an ibis, whereas members of the Raphinae are known to have been fruit eaters. The species was termed a land-bird by Dubois, so it did not live in typical ibis habitats such as wetlands. This is similar to the Réunion swamphen, which lived in forest rather than swamps, which is otherwise typical swamphen habitat. Cheke and Hume proposed that the ancestors of these birds colonised Réunion before swamps had developed, and had therefore become adapted to the available habitats. They were perhaps prevented from colonising Mauritius as well due to the presence of red rails there, which may have occupied a similar niche.

The Réunion ibis appears to have lived in high altitudes, and perhaps had a limited distribution. Accounts by early visitors indicate the species was found near their landing sites, but they were found only in remote places by 1667. The bird may have survived in eastern lowlands until the 1670s. Though many late 17th century accounts state the bird was good food, Feuilley stated it tasted bad. This may be because it changed its diet when it moved to more rugged, higher terrain, to escape pigs that destroyed its nests; since it had limited flight capabilities, it probably nested on the ground.

Many other endemic species of Réunion became extinct after the human colonisation and the resulting disruption of the island's ecosystem. The Réunion ibis lived alongside other recently extinct birds such as the hoopoe starling, the Mascarene parrot, the Réunion parakeet, the Réunion swamphen, the Réunion scops owl, the Réunion night heron, and the Réunion pink pigeon. Extinct reptiles include the Réunion giant tortoise and an undescribed Leiolopisma skink. The small Mauritian flying fox and the snail Tropidophora carinata lived on Réunion and Mauritius, but vanished from both islands.

== Extinction ==
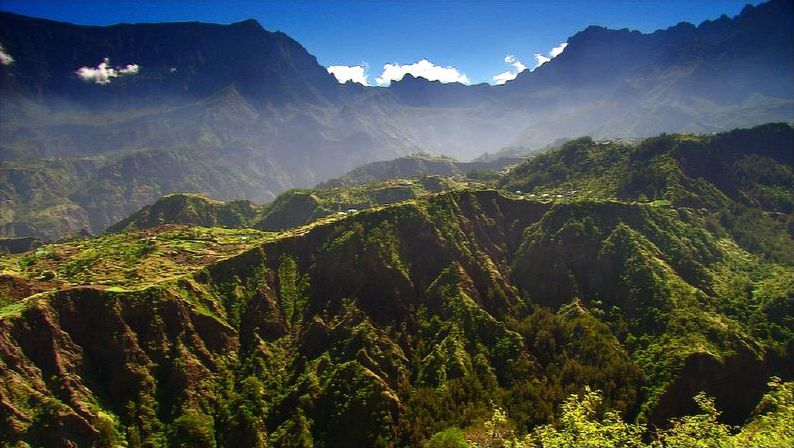
Mountains on Réunion; this bird may have become confined to higher areas after the arrival of humans and their introduced animals.

As Réunion was populated by settlers, the Réunion ibis appears to have become confined to the tops of mountains. Introduced predators such as cats and rats took a toll. Overhunting also contributed and several contemporary accounts state the bird was widely hunted for food. In 1625, John Tatton described the tameness of the bird and how easy it was to hunt, as well as the large quantity consumed:

There is store of land fowle both small and great, plenty of Doves, great Parrats, and such like; and a great fowle of the bignesse of a Turkie, very fat, and so short winged, that they cannot fly, being white, and in a manner tame: and so be all other fowles, as having not been troubled nor feared with shot. Our men did beat them down with sticks and stones. Ten men may take fowle enough to serve fortie men a day.

In 1671, Melet mentioned the culinary quality of this species, and described the slaughter of several types of birds on the island:

(A)nother sort of bird called solitaires which are very good (to eat) and the beauty of their plumage is most fascinating for the diversity of bright colours that shine on their wing and around their necks... There are birds in such great confusion and so tame that it is not necessary to go hunting with firearms, they can so easily be killed with a little stick or rod. During the five or six days that we were allowed to go into the woods, so many were killed that our General [de La Haye] was constrained to forbid anyone going beyond a hundred paces from the camp for fear the whole quarter would be destroyed, for one needed only to catch one bird alive and make it cry out, to have in a moment whole flocks coming to perch on people, so that often without moving from one spot one could kill hundreds. But, seeing that it would have been impossible to wipe out such a huge quantity, permission was again given to kill, which gave great joy to everyone, because very good fare was had at no expense.

The last definite account of the "solitaire" of Réunion was Feuilley's from 1708, indicating that the species probably became extinct sometime early in the century. In the 1820s, the French navigator Louis de Freycinet asked an old slave about drontes (old Dutch word for dodo), and was told the bird existed around Saint-Joseph when his father was an infant. This would perhaps be a century earlier, but the account may be unreliable. Cheke and Hume suspect that feral cats initially hunted wildlife in the lowlands and later turned to higher inland areas, which were probably the last stronghold of the Réunion ibis, as they were unreachable by pigs. The species is thought to have been driven to extinction around 1710–1715.
