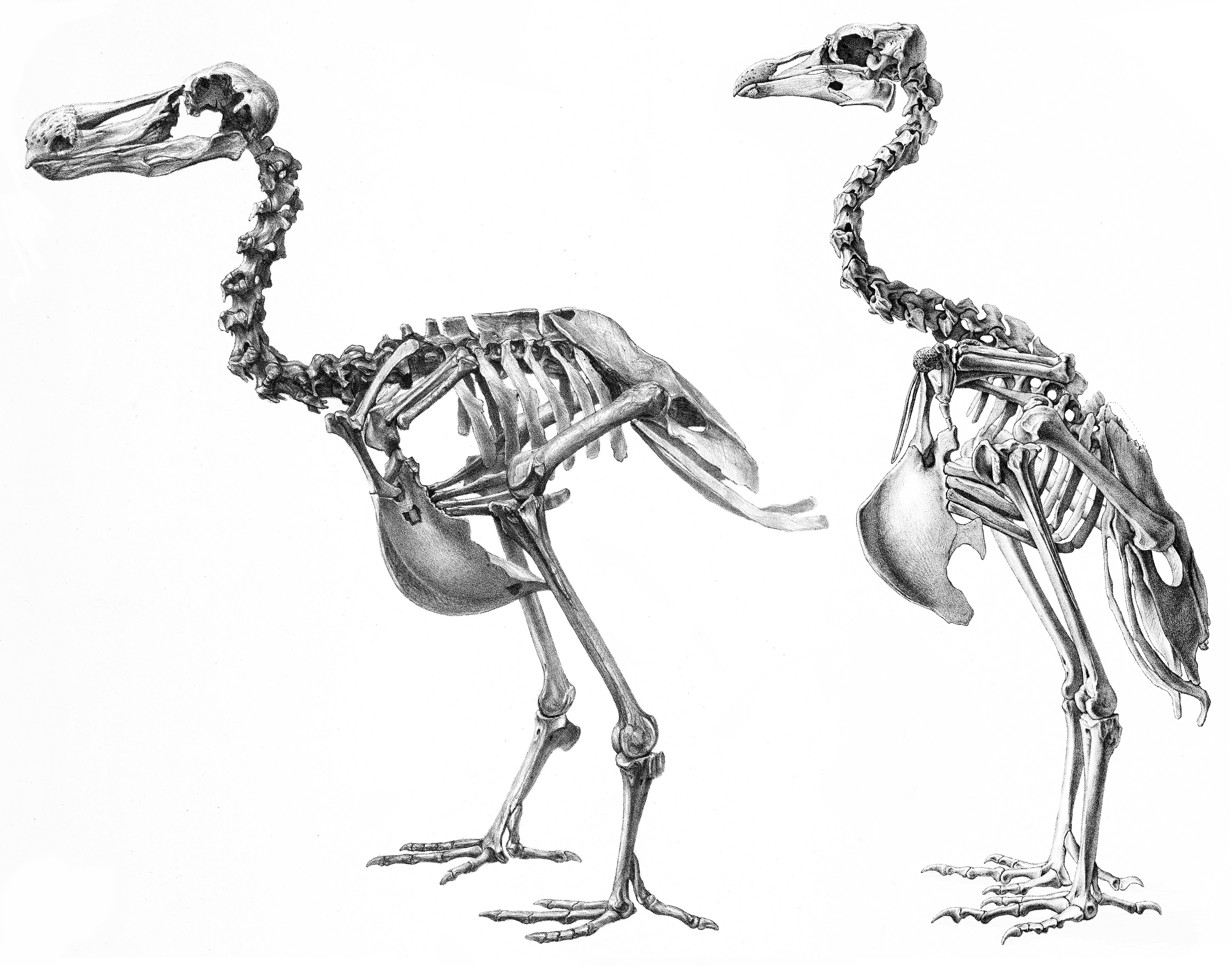
- Dodo and Rodrigues solitaire skeletons compared, not to scale

Scientific classification
- Kingdom: Animalia
- Phylum: Chordata
- Class: Aves
- Order: Columbiformes
- Family: Columbidae
- Subfamily: Raphinae
- Tribe: Raphini
- Subtribe: †Raphina; Oudemans, 1917 (Young et al., 2024)

Type species
- †Raphus cucullatus (Linnaeus, 1758)

Genera
- †Pezophaps; †Raphus
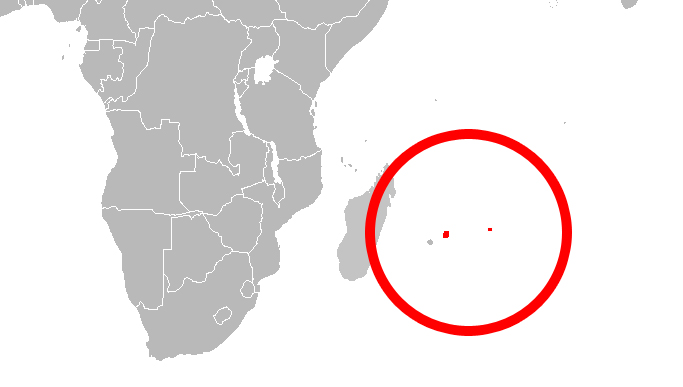
- Former range (in red)

Synonyms
- List: Didi Bonaparte, 1857; Raphi Ridgeway, 1916; Didiadae Swainson, 1836; Dididae Swainson, 1837; Didusidae Lesson, 1842; Raphidae Poche, 1904 (unavailable) (Note: Raphidae Poche, 1904 is not available because Poche definitely based it on the genus Raphus Mohring, 1752 which is unavailable as a pre-Linnaean name.); Raphidae Wetmore, 1930; Didinae Strickland & Melville, 1848; Pezophapidae Hachisuka, 1953; Pezophabidae (Hachisuka, 1953); Inepti Illiger, 1811 (unavailable) (Note: The family Inepti (Illiger 1811) is unavailable because it was not defined on any genus.); Raphini Verheyen, 1957; Pezophabini Verheyen, 1957

= Raphina =

Raphines Temporal range: Holocene

Extinct subtribe of birds

The Raphina are a clade of extinct flightless birds formerly called didines or didine birds. (Note: From the dodo's obsolete genus name, Didus.) They inhabited the Mascarene Islands of Mauritius and Rodrigues, but became extinct through hunting by humans and predation by introduced non-native mammals following human colonisation in the 17th century. Historically, many different groups have been named for both the dodo and the Rodrigues solitaire, not all grouping them together. Most recently, it is considered that the two birds can be classified in Columbidae, often under the subfamily Raphinae. The first person to suggest a close affinity to the doves was Johannes Theodor Reinhardt, whose opinions were then supported by Hugh Edwin Strickland and Alexander Gordon Melville.

Recent extractions of DNA from the dodo and Rodrigues solitaire, as well as 37 species of doves, has found where in Columbidae the raphines should be placed. Raphines are not the most primitive columbid, instead they are grouped with the Nicobar pigeon as their closest relative, with other closely related birds being the crowned pigeons and tooth-billed pigeon. A third raphine, Raphus solitarius, is now considered to be an ibis in the genus Threskiornis.

Both the Rodrigues solitaire and the dodo are now extinct. A common threshold of the extinction of the dodo is 1662, but some possible sightings had been made as late as 1688. The last sighting with a description was in 1662, but a statistical analysis by Roberts and Solow found that the extinction of the dodo was in 1693. The Rodrigues solitaire was killed off later than the dodo. The IUCN uses an extinction date of 1778 for the solitaire, although a more probable date would be in the 1750s or 1760s. Both birds became extinct as a consequence of human hunting and the introduction of mammals that ate the birds and their eggs.

== Classification ==
This clade is part of the order Columbiformes and contains the monotypic genera Pezophaps and Raphus. The former contains the species Pezophaps solitaria (the Rodrigues solitaire), the latter the dodo, Raphus cucullatus. These birds reached an impressive size as a result of isolation on islands free of predators, in accordance with Foster's rule.

=== History of classification ===
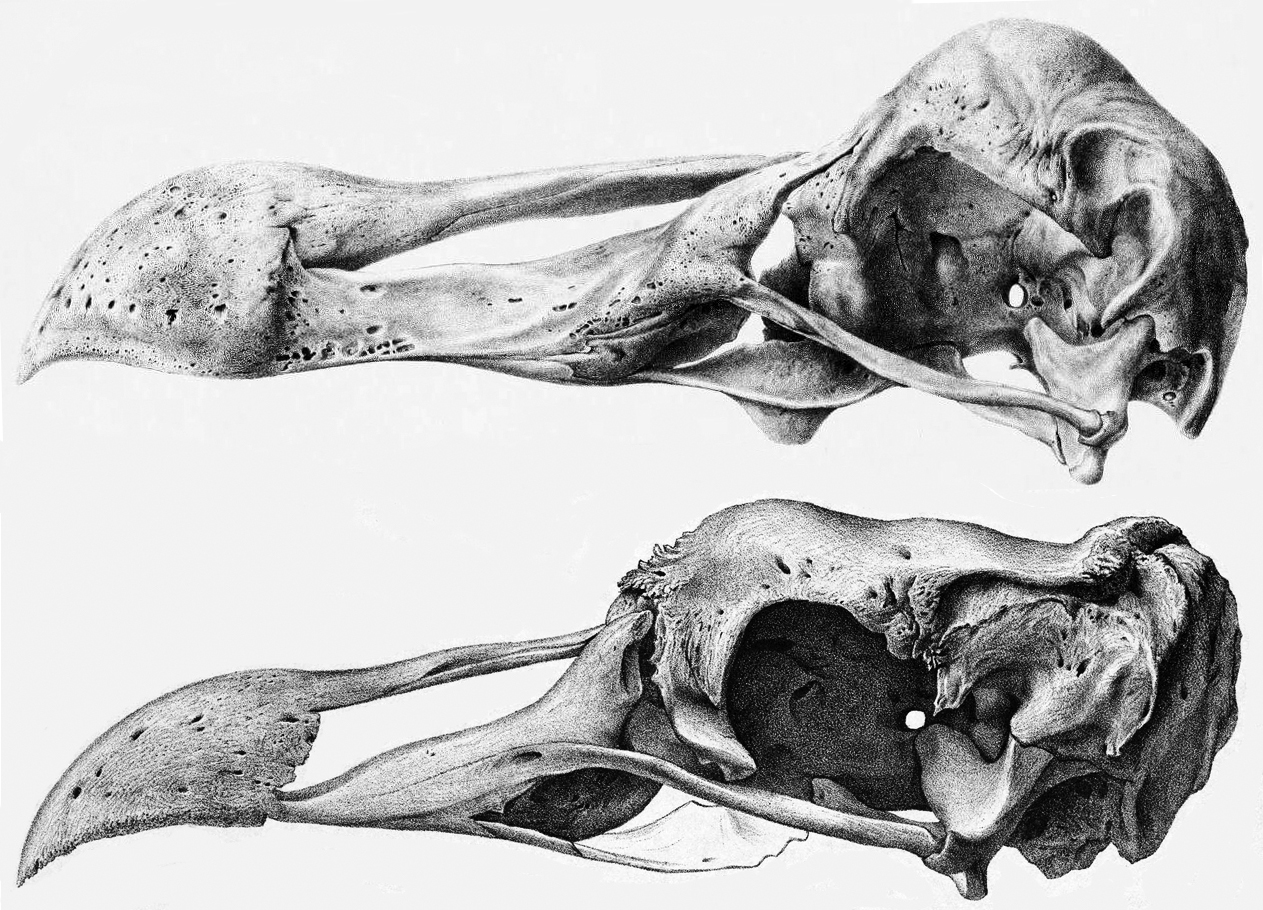
Skulls of the dodo and Rodrigues solitaire, the latter having been scaled up for comparison

Historically, the dodo was assigned the genus Didus, now a junior synonym of Raphus. In 1848, a new species within the now defunct genus Didus, D. nazarenus, was named by Hugh Edwin Strickland and Alexander Gordon Melville. To house their new species, as well as the other species known at the time, Strickland and Melville named the subfamily Didinae. In 1893 three species were assigned to the group Pezophaps solitarius, Didus ineptus, and the possible species Didus borbonicus. Today, only two raphine species are known, with Didus ineptus becoming a junior subjective synonym of Raphus cucullatus; Didus? borbonicus now classified as the ibis Threskiornis solitarius; and Didus nazarenus being identified as synonymous with Pezophaps solitarius.

A suborder named in 1893 by Sharpe, Didi was defined as a group including only the massive birds, that were sister to Columbidae, from the Mascarene Islands of Mauritius, Réunion, and Rodrigues. Features grouping Didi with Columbidae were the angle of the mandible and the hook at the end of the beak.

In 1811, Johann Karl Wilhelm Illiger created a new family for the genus Didus. He named the family Inepti, and in it included only Didus ineptus, now a synonym of Raphus cucullatus. Illiger concluded that the dodo was related to ostriches and rheas, and so placed Inepti in the order Rasores, as the sister family to Gallinacei, Epollicati (a defunct group including Turnix and Syrrhaptes), Columbini, and Crypturi.

In 1842, Johannes Theodor Reinhardt proposed they were ground doves, based on studies of a dodo skull he had rediscovered in the royal Danish collection of Copenhagen. This view was met with ridicule, but later supported by Strickland and Melville, who suggested the common descent of the Rodrigues solitaire and the dodo in 1848, after dissecting the only known dodo specimen with soft tissue and comparing it with the few solitaire remains then available. Strickland stated that although not identical, these birds shared many distinguishing features in the leg bones, features which were otherwise known only in pigeons.

The raphines were sometimes separated as a distinct family Raphidae, and their affinities were for long uncertain. They were initially placed in the ratites due to their peculiar, flightlessness-related apomorphies, and a relationship to the Rallidae has also been suggested. Osteological and molecular data, however, agrees that placement in the Columbidae is more appropriate. Many different affinities have historically been suggested for the dodo, including that it was a small ostrich, a rail, an albatross, or a vulture.

=== Phylogeny ===
Comparison of mitochondrial cytochrome b and 12S rRNA sequences isolated from a dodo tarsal and a Rodrigues solitaire femur supported their close relationship and their placement within the family of pigeons and doves Columbidae. The genetic evidence was interpreted as suggesting the Southeast Asian Nicobar pigeon (Caloenas nicobarica) to be their closest living relative among 35 analyzed species of pigeons and doves, followed by the crowned pigeons (genus Goura) of New Guinea and the superficially dodo-like tooth-billed pigeon from Samoa. The genus of the latter is Didunculus ("little dodo"), and it was called "dodlet" by Richard Owen. The following cladogram, from Shapiro and colleagues (2002), shows the position of the dodo and solitaire within the pigeon and dove family.

- - - Goura victoria
    - - - - Caloenas nicobarica
          - - †Pezophaps solitaria
            - †Raphus cucullatus
  - Didunculus strigirostris

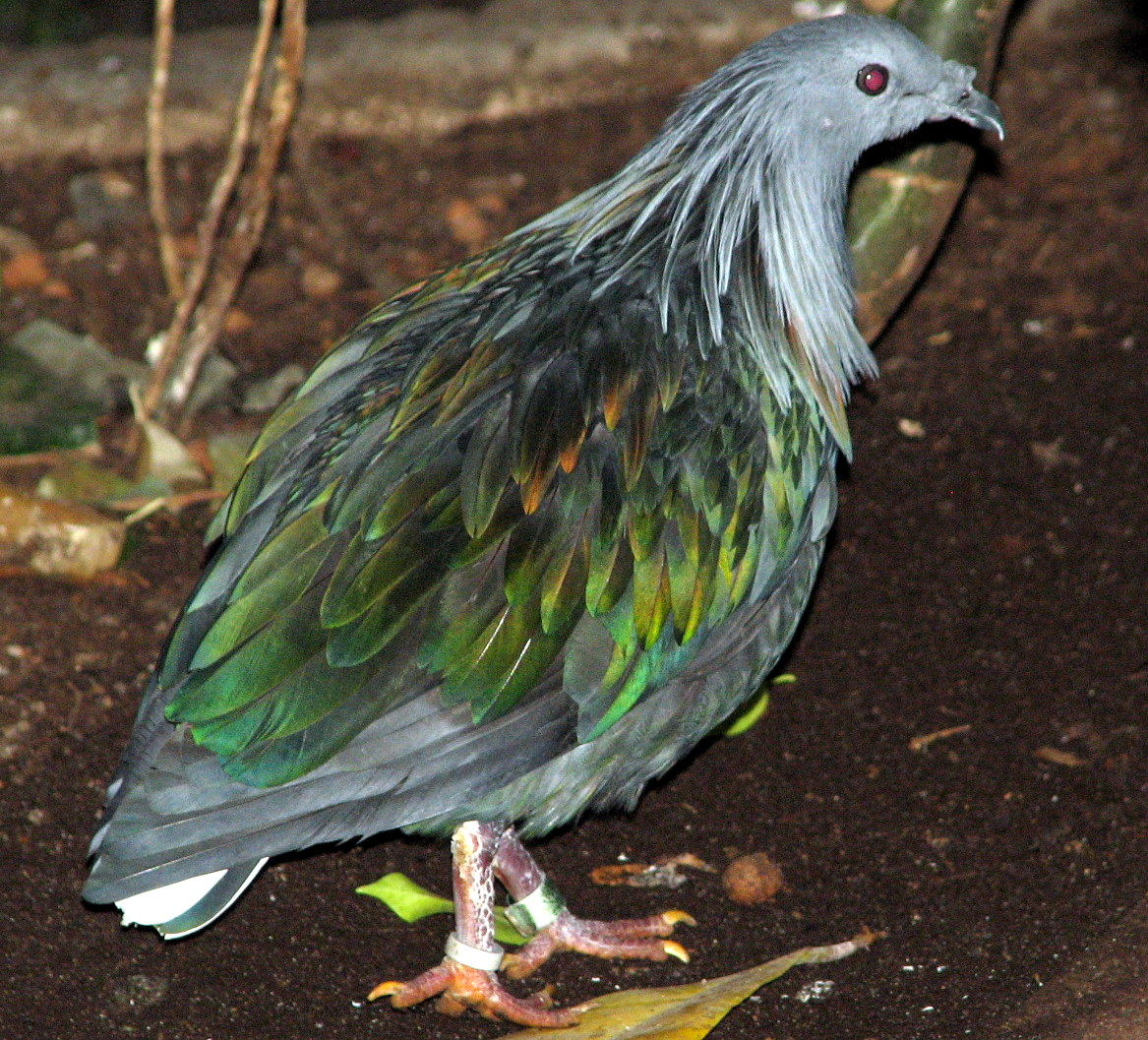
The Nicobar pigeon (Caloenas nicobarica) is the closest living relative of the dodo and the Rodrigues solitaire.

A similar cladogram was published in 2007, inverting the placement of Goura and Didunculus and including the pheasant pigeon and the thick-billed ground pigeon at the base of the clade. Based on behavioural and morphological evidence, Jolyon C. Parish proposed that the dodo and Rodrigues solitaire should be placed in the Gourinae subfamily along with the Goura pigeons and others, in agreement with the genetic evidence. In 2014, DNA of the only known specimen of the recently extinct spotted green pigeon (Caloenas maculata) was analysed, and it was found to be a close relative of the Nicobar pigeon, and thus also the dodo and Rodrigues solitaire.

For many years the dodo and the Rodrigues solitaire were placed in a family of their own, the Raphidae (formerly Dididae), because their exact relationships with other pigeons were unresolved. Each was placed in its own monotypic family (Raphidae and Pezophapidae, respectively), as it was thought that they had evolved their similar features independently. Osteological and molecular data has since led to the dissolution of the family Raphidae, and the dodo and solitaire are now placed in the columbid subfamily Raphinae and tribe Raphini, along with their closest relatives. In 2024, the new subtribe Raphina was created to include only the dodo and the solitaire, and the authors proposed the vernacular name 'Mascarene giant ground doves' for them. (Note: In 1966, Raphinae was named for a subfamily within Noctuidae. It was later found to be synonymous with Dilobinae.)

The "Réunion solitaire", long considered a third extinct didine bird, has turned out to be an ibis; it is now known as Threskiornis solitarius.

=== Divergence ===
The 2002 study indicated that the ancestors of the Rodrigues solitaire and the dodo diverged around the Paleogene-Neogene boundary. The Mascarene Islands (Mauritius, Réunion, and Rodrigues), are of volcanic origin and are less than 10 million years old. Therefore, the ancestors of both birds probably remained capable of flight for a considerable time after the separation of their lineage. The lack of mammalian herbivores competing for resources on these islands allowed the solitaire and the dodo to attain very large sizes. The DNA obtained from the Oxford specimen is degraded, and no usable DNA has been extracted from subfossil remains, so the age of the groups divergence from other pigeons still needs to be independently verified. The dodo lost the ability to fly owing to the lack of mammalian predators on Mauritius. Another large, flightless pigeon, the Viti Levu giant pigeon (Natunaornis gigoura), was described in 2001 from subfossil material from Fiji. It was only slightly smaller than the dodo and the Rodrigues solitaire, and it too is thought to have been related to the crowned pigeons.

It has been estimated that the group containing the dodo and the Rodrigues solitaire diverged from genera like Goura about 1.5 million years ago. However, that estimate appears highly unlikely. It was estimated that the relatives of the two species moved to the island about 35 million years ago, when a land bridge between Nazareth (Rodrigues) or St. Brandon banks and Mauritius formed.

== Description ==
Many of the skeletal features that distinguish the dodo and the Rodrigues solitaire, its closest relative, from pigeons have been attributed to their flightlessness. The pelvic elements were thicker than those of flighted pigeons to support the higher weight, and the pectoral region and the small wings were paedomorphic, meaning that they were underdeveloped and retained juvenile features. The skull, trunk and pelvic limbs were peramorphic, meaning that they changed considerably with age. The dodo shared several other traits with the Rodrigues solitaire, such as features of the skull, pelvis, and sternum, as well as their large size. It differed in other aspects, such as being more robust and shorter than the solitaire, having a larger skull and beak, a rounded skull roof, and smaller orbits. The dodo's neck and legs were proportionally shorter, and it did not possess an equivalent to the knob present on the solitaire's wrists.

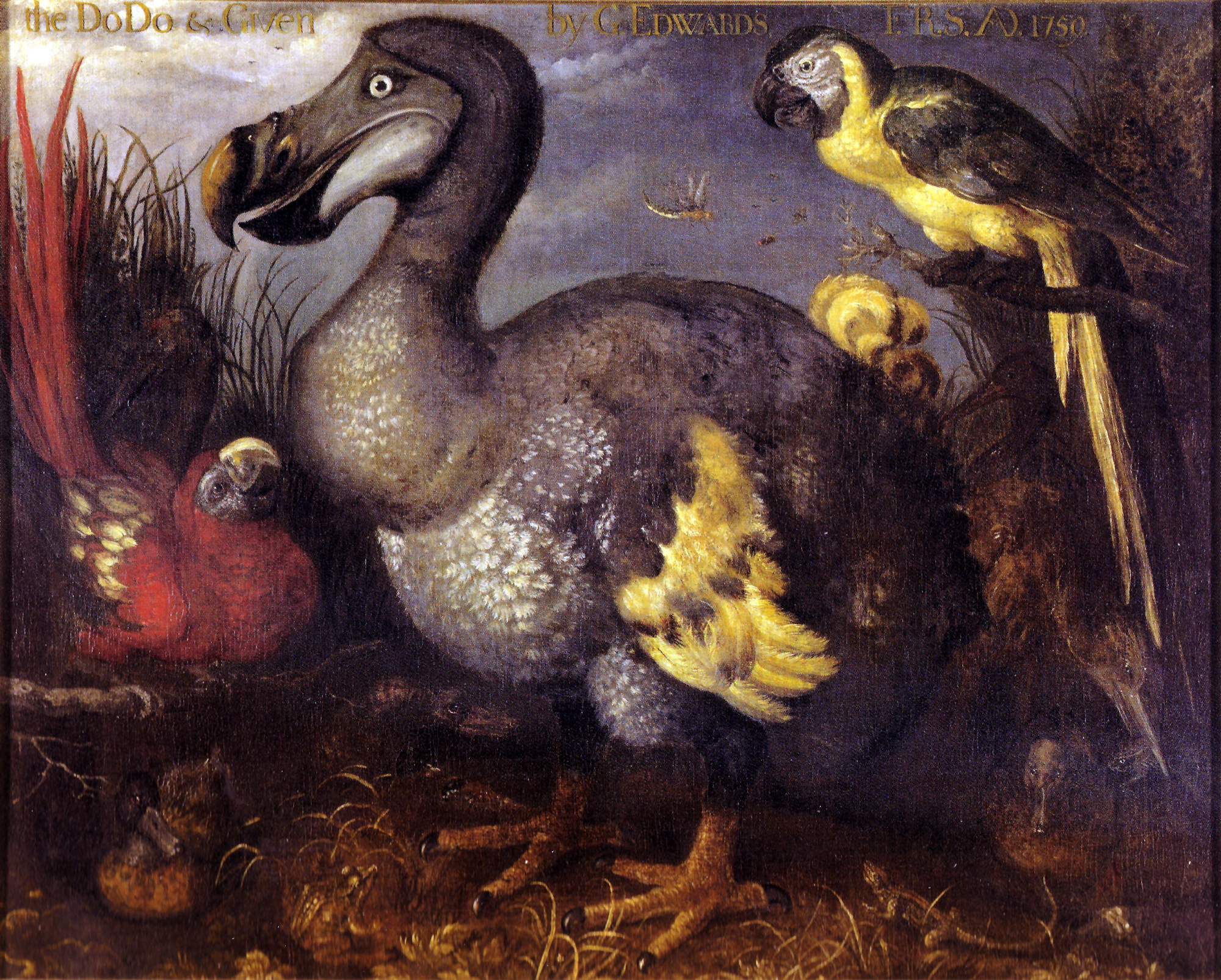
Famous depiction of a dodo with a lesser Antillean macaw (left), Martinique macaw (right), and red rail (bottom)

As no complete dodo specimens exist, its external appearance, such as plumage and colouration, is hard to determine. Illustrations and written accounts of encounters with the dodo between its discovery and its extinction (1598–1662) are the primary evidence for its external appearance. According to most representations, the dodo had greyish or brownish plumage, with lighter primary feathers and a tuft of curly light feathers high on its rear end. The head was grey and naked, the beak green, black and yellow, and the legs were stout and yellowish, with black claws. Subfossil remains and remnants of the birds that were brought to Europe in the 17th century show that they were very large birds, 1 metre (3.3 feet) tall, and possibly weighing up to 23 kilograms (51 lb). The higher weights have been attributed to birds in captivity; weights in the wild were estimated to have been in the range 10.6–21.1 kg (23–47 lb). A later estimate gives an average weight as low as 10.2 kg (22 lb). This has been questioned, and there is still some controversy. It has been suggested that the weight depended on the season, and that individuals were fat during cool seasons, but less so during hot. The bird was sexually dimorphic: males were larger and had proportionally longer beaks. The beak was up to 23 centimetres (9.1 in) in length and had a hooked point. A study of the few remaining feathers on the Oxford specimen head showed that they were pennaceous (vaned feathers with barbs and quills) rather than plumaceous (downy) and most similar to those of other pigeons.

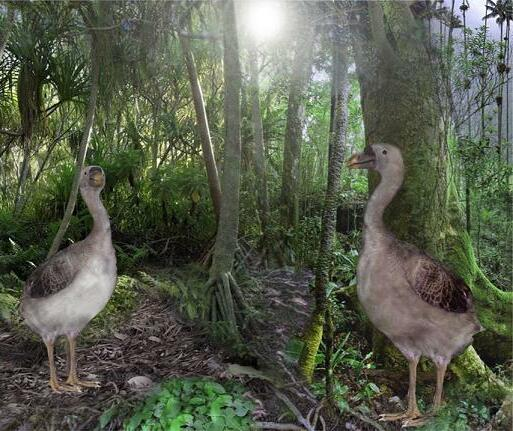
Digital recreation of a Rodrigues solitaire, based on skeleton morphology and Leguat description.

The beak of the solitaire was slightly hooked, and its neck and legs were long. One observer described it as the size of a swan. The skull was 170 millimetres (6.7 in) long, flattened at the top with the fore and hind parts elevated into two bony ridges structured with cancellous. A black band (a contemporary description described it as a "frontlet" (Note: The Oxford English Dictionary gives a meaning of frontlet that is used in ornithology as the margin just behind the beak and provides a quote of it being used in this way in 1874.)) appeared on its head just behind the base of the beak. The plumage of the Rodrigues solitaire was described as grey and brown. Females were paler than males and had light-coloured elevations on the lower neck. Sexual size dimorphism in the solitaire is perhaps the greatest in any neognath. One group, probably the males, were considerably larger than the other, measuring 90 cm (35 in) in length and weighing up to 28 kg (62 lb), whereas the smaller group, probably females, were only 70 cm (28 in) and weighed 17 kg (37 lb). This is only 60% of the weight of a larger individual. Their weight may have varied substantially due to fat cycles, meaning that individuals were fat during cool seasons, but slim during hot seasons, and may have been as low as 21 kg (46 lb) in the larger gender and 13 kg (29 lb) in the smaller. Though male pigeons are usually larger than females, there is no direct evidence for the largest specimens actually being the males of the species, and this has only been assumed based on early works. Though the male was probably largest, this can only be confirmed by molecular sexing techniques, and not skeletal morphology alone.

== Behaviour ==
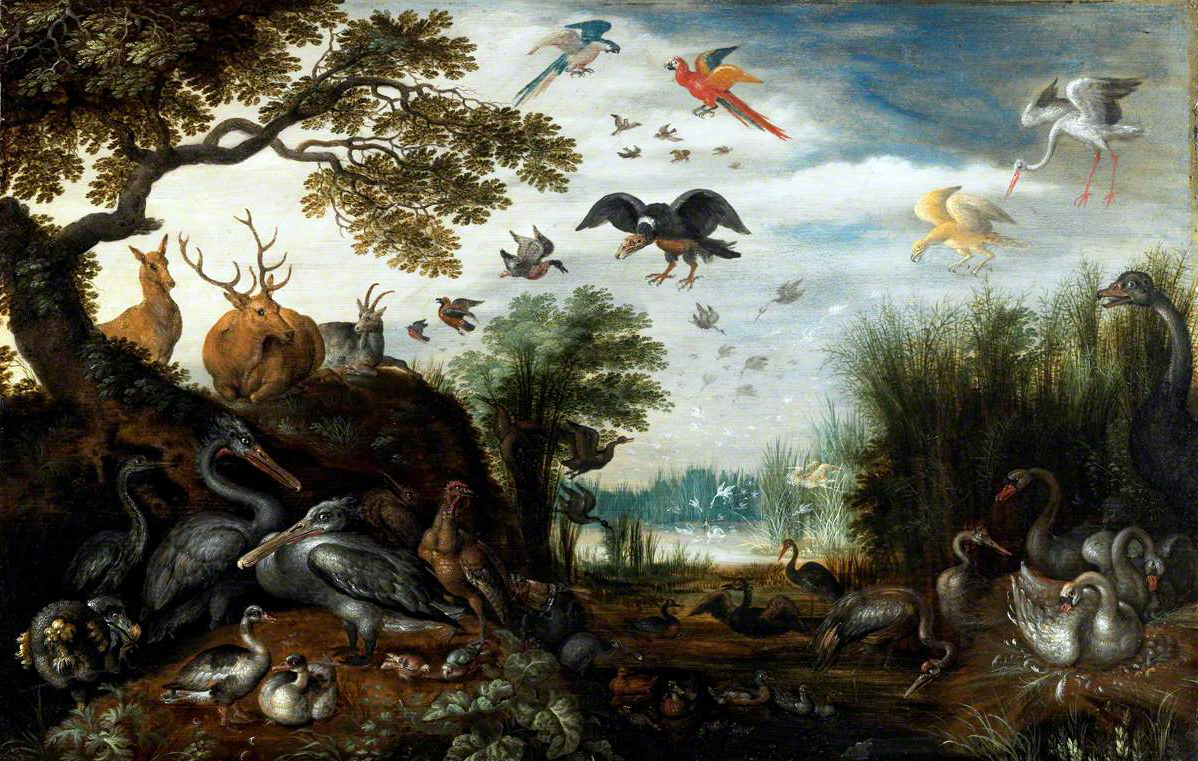
Dodo preening itself in a Roelant Savery painting from 1626

Little is known of the behaviour of the dodo, as most contemporary descriptions are very brief. Based on weight estimates, it has been suggested the male could reach the age of 21, and the female 17. Studies of the cantilever strength of its leg bones indicate that it could run quite fast. Unlike the Rodrigues solitaire, there is no evidence that the dodo used its wings in intraspecific combat. Though some dodo bones have been found with healed fractures, it had weak pectoral muscles and more reduced wings in comparison. The dodo may instead have used its large, hooked beak in territorial disputes. Since Mauritius received more rain and had a more stable climate than Rodrigues, there was probably less need for male dodos to fight over territory. The solitaire was therefore probably the more aggressive of the two.

Observations of the Rodrigues solitaire in life indicate that they were highly territorial. They presumably settled disputes by striking each other with their wings; to aid this purpose, they used the knobs on their wrists. Fractures in their wing bones also indicate that they were used in combat. It has also been suggested that these fractures may instead have been the result of a hereditary bone disease rather than battle-injuries. But in all extant birds where carpal spurs and knobs are present, these are used as weapons without exceptions. Though some dodo bones have been found with healed fractures, it had weak pectoral muscles and more reduced wings in comparison with the Rodrigues solitaire. Since Rodrigues receives less rainfall and has more seasonal variation than Mauritius, which would have affected the availability of resources on the island, the solitaire would have more reason to evolve aggressive territorial behaviour. Several accounts state that they also defended themselves with a powerful bite.

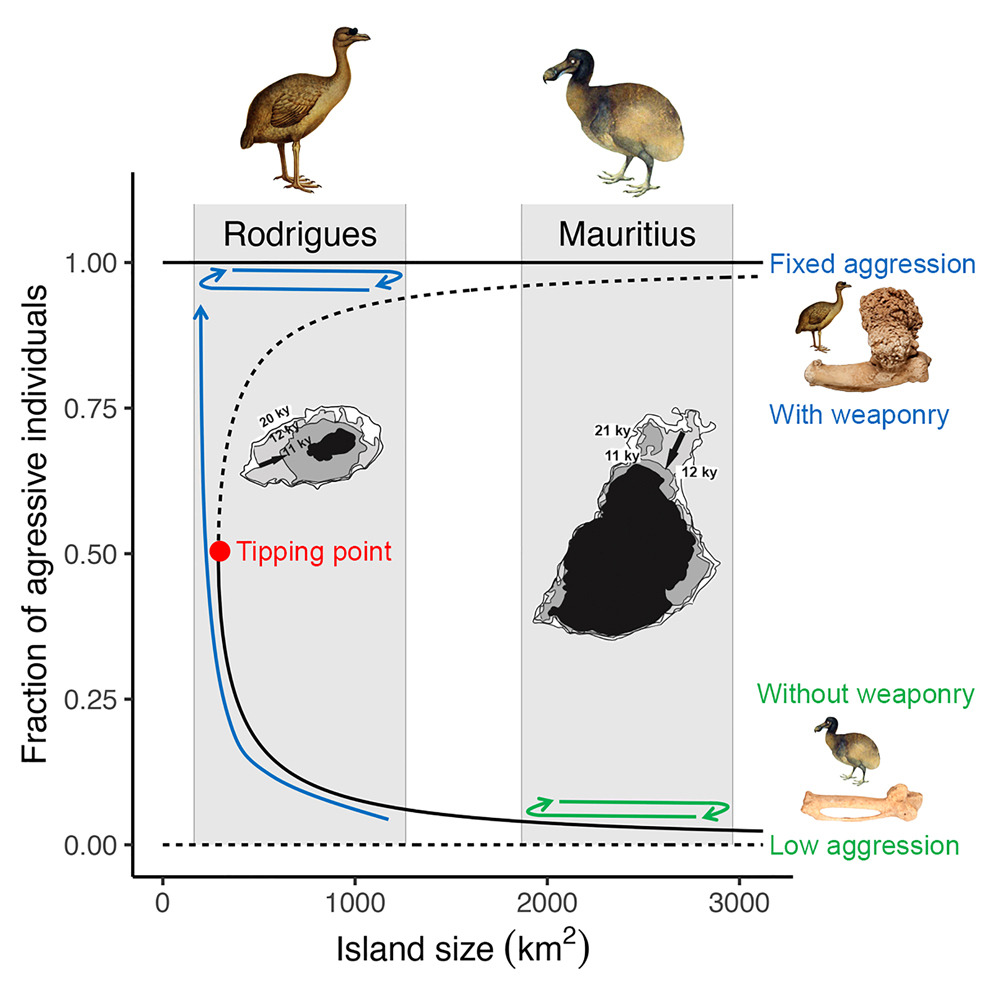
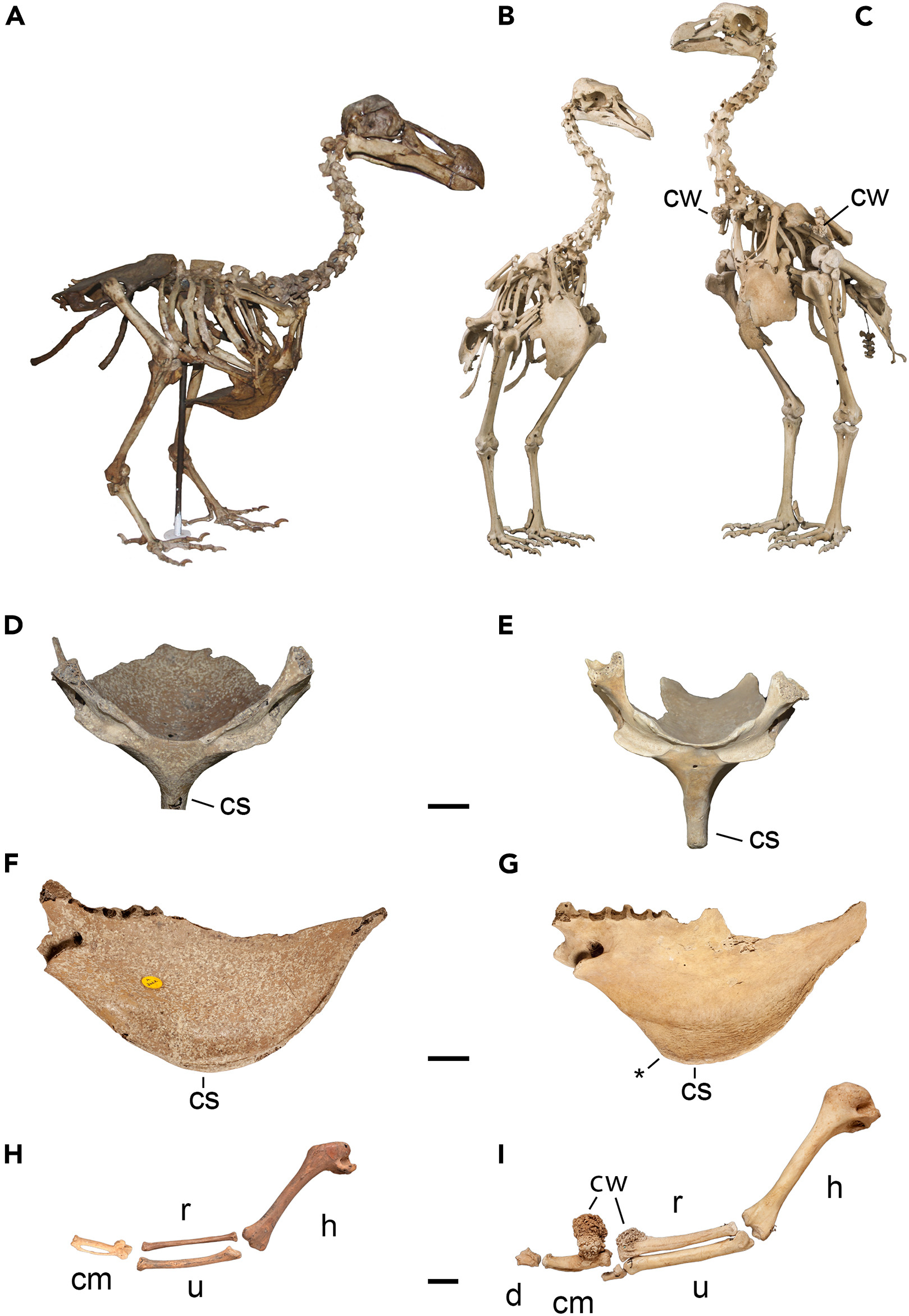
Correlation between aggressive behaviour and decreasing island size in the Rodrigues solitaire (left) and comparison with the dodo, according to a 2024 study

In 2024, the Dutch biologist Kenneth F. Rijsdijk and colleagues examined why the Rodrigues solitaire and the dodo differed in their level of aggressive behaviour; while the solitaire was aggressive, the dodo confirmed to the idea that island species develop island tameness. This despite the two being sister species that lived on neighbouring islands, about 600 km (370 mi) apart. They compared the change of island size due to sea level changes with population dynamics by using the Hawk-Dove game model, and concluded that a rapid decrease in island size, as was the case with the much smaller Rodrigues, triggered the onset of aggressive behaviour, due to the resulting competition for the limited resources there.

== Extinction ==
The last surviving raphine species, the Rodrigues solitaire, probably became extinct before 1778. The dodo survived until 1662 or 1690. The Rodrigues solitaire became extinct because of the introduction of feral cats and heavy hunting by the human population. Although the dodo became extinct earlier, the causes of extinction are related and involve the introduction of animals and hunting.

=== Extinction of the dodo ===
Like many animals that evolved in isolation from significant predators, the dodo was entirely fearless of humans. This fearlessness and its inability to fly made the dodo easy prey for sailors. The human population on Mauritius (an area of 1,860 km^{2} or 720 sq mi) never exceeded 50 people in the 17th century, but they introduced other animals, including dogs, pigs, cats, rats, and crab-eating macaques, which plundered dodo nests and competed for the limited food resources. At the same time, humans destroyed the dodo's forest habitat. The impact of these introduced animals, especially the pigs and macaques, on the dodo population is currently considered more severe than that of hunting. Rats would not have caused such a problem for the dodo, as they would have been used to dealing with local land crabs.

The latest definite sighting of dodos, on Amber Island in 1662, may not necessarily have been the last members of the species. The last claimed sighting of a dodo was reported in the hunting records of Isaac Johannes Lamotius in 1688. Statistical analysis of these records by Roberts and Solow gives a new estimated extinction date of 1693, with a 95% confidence interval of 1688–1715. The authors also pointed out that because the last sighting before 1662 was in 1638, the dodo was probably already quite rare by the 1660s, and thus a disputed report from 1674 by an escaped slave cannot be dismissed out of hand.

=== Extinction of the Rodrigues solitaire ===
Although the IUCN lists the Rodrigues solitaire as going extinct by 1778, the species probably became extinct some time between the 1730s and 1760s; the exact date is unknown. Its disappearance coincided with the tortoise trade between 1730 and 1750, when traders burnt off vegetation, hunted solitaires, and released cats and pigs that preyed on eggs and chicks. In 1755, Joseph-François Charpentier de Cossigny attempted to obtain a live specimen, as he had been assured the Rodrigues solitaire still survived in remote areas of the island. After searching for 18 months and offering large rewards, he could find none. He noted that cats were blamed for decimating the species, but suspected that it was really due to hunting by humans. When he visited Rodrigues to observe the 1761 transit of Venus, Alexandre Guy Pingré encountered no solitaires, although he had been assured that they survived.

== Footnotes ==
Explanatory notes

Citations
