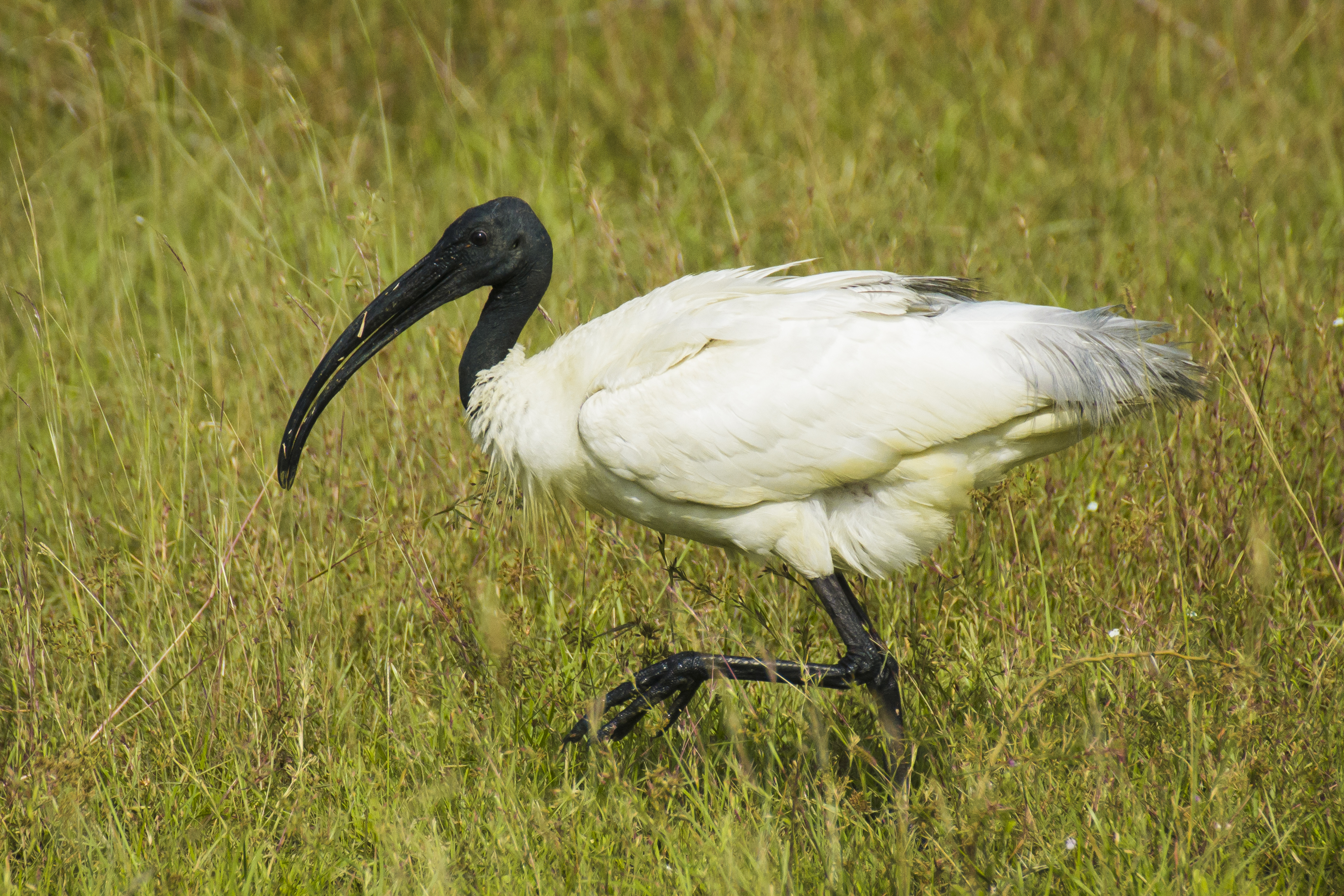
- Wild individual photographed at Tirunelveli, India

Conservation status
- Least Concern (IUCN 3.1)

Scientific classification
- Kingdom: Animalia
- Phylum: Chordata
- Class: Aves
- Order: Pelecaniformes
- Family: Threskiornithidae
- Genus: Threskiornis
- Species: T. melanocephalus

Binomial name
- Threskiornis melanocephalus (Latham, 1790)

Synonyms
- Tantalus melanocephalus Latham, 1790

= Black-headed ibis =

Species of bird

The black-headed ibis (Threskiornis melanocephalus), also known as the Oriental white ibis, Indian white ibis, and black-necked ibis, is a species of wading bird of the ibis family Threskiornithidae which breeds in the South and Southeast Asia from India to the west and as far east as Japan. It is the only native ibis species in its range that has an overall white plumage with a black neck and head. The down-curved beak and legs are also black. Though often referred to as a wetland species, the black-headed ibis forages in a range of natural and man-made habitats. This species of ibis nests only during the rainy season.

== Description ==
The skin under the wings is red

The black-headed ibis is one of several large waterbird species in south and south-east Asia, with adults measuring 65–76 cm in length. The white plumage is starkly contrasted against a conspicuous naked black neck and head, and black down-curved beak. Tails of adults bear light grey ornamental feathers that turn jet black during the breeding season. During the breeding season, bare patches under the wing turn blood-red. The head of some breeding adults gain a blueish tinge, or very rarely have a pink or bright red patch behind the neck. Some breeding adults also develop tufts of white feathers behind the neck, and rarely also get a yellowish colouration on the breast and back. Sexes are identical but juveniles are identifiable from adults in having greyish feathering on the neck and speckled brown-grey feathering on the wings and back. Like storks and spoonbills, it lacks a true voice-producing mechanism and is silent except for ventriloquistic grunts uttered by pairs at the nest.

== Distribution and habitat ==
Black-headed ibis are native to the following countries: Bangladesh, Cambodia, China, Hong Kong, India, Indonesia, Malaysia, Myanmar, Nepal, Pakistan, Philippines, Russian Federation, Sri Lanka, Thailand and Vietnam. They are migratory or vagrant in Japan, Republic of Korea, Lao People's Democratic Republic and Mongolia. The species is a widespread breeding bird in India, Sri Lanka, Nepal and Myanmar, and has declined considerably to few locations or breeding colonies in Cambodia, Indonesia, Malaysia, Thailand, and Vietnam. The most rapid decline in recent times is suspected to be the population in Sumatra.

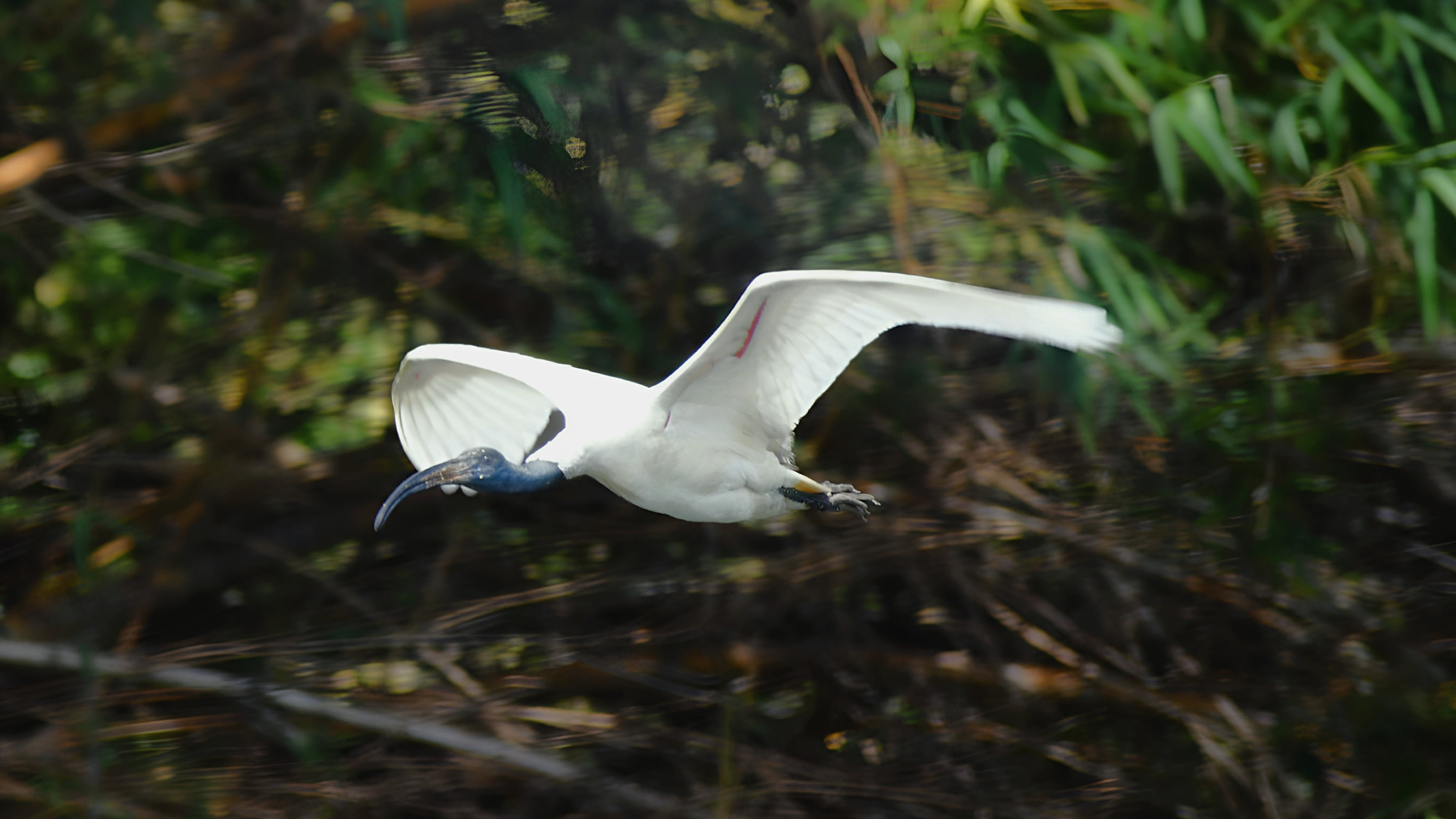
A black-headed ibis in flight over the Ranganathittu Bird Sanctuary in Karnataka, India.

The black-headed ibis is very versatile being able to use a large variety of natural and man-made habitats. These include freshwater and salt-water marshes, lakes and ponds, as also rice fields, freshly ploughed crop fields, irrigation canals, riversides, reservoirs, urban lakes, open sewage gutters, grazing lots, and garbage dumping sites. Ibis alter use of varied preferred foraging habitats by season in agricultural landscapes such as in south-western Uttar Pradesh in India. In summer, they largely use and prefer natural marshes and fallow fields, but in the monsoon, spread out more evenly to also use a variety of agricultural fields. In landscapes that have more forests and rocky hills as in southern Rajasthan, wetlands are the preferred habitats year-round and there is little difference in habitats used in different seasons. In more urban landscapes, black-headed ibis abundance was positively associated with crop fields, wetlands and open areas. Open sewage lines are used more during the dry summers, and ibis increase the use of grazing lands during the monsoon.

It nests in heronry colonies near wetlands. It builds a platform nest of sticks, lined with grass and threads. Old trees in cities are used for night roosting and for nesting.

An investigation of the daily activity budget of black-headed ibises in a protected wetland showed them to spend the maximum time feeding (48%), followed by resting (23%).
