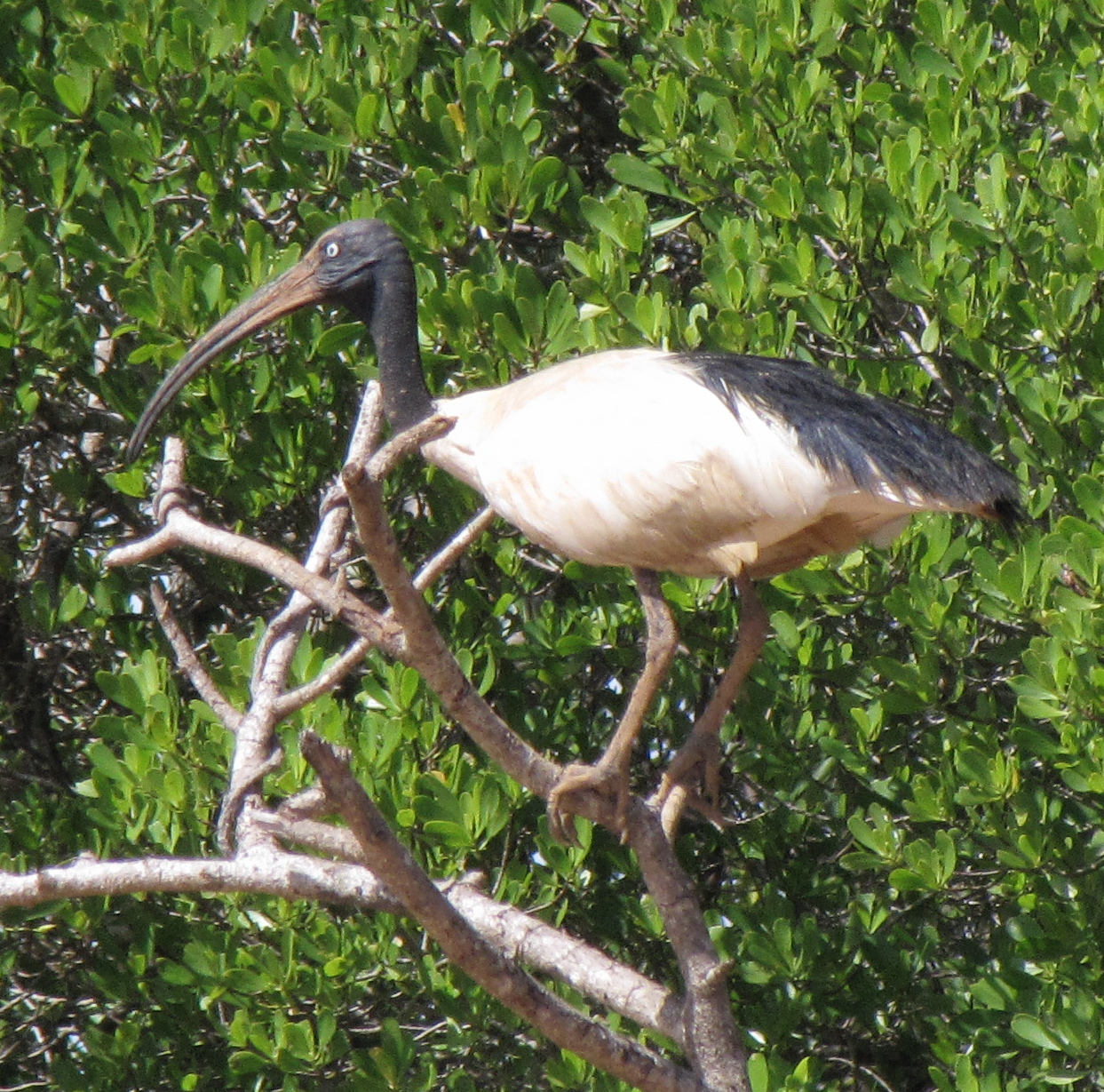

Conservation status
- Endangered (IUCN 3.1)

Scientific classification
- Kingdom: Animalia
- Phylum: Chordata
- Class: Aves
- Order: Pelecaniformes
- Family: Threskiornithidae
- Genus: Threskiornis
- Species: T. bernieri

Binomial name
- Threskiornis bernieri (Bonaparte, 1855)

= Malagasy sacred ibis =

Species of bird

The Malagasy sacred ibis (Threskiornis bernieri) is a relatively large, heavily built ibis endemic to the west coast of Madagascar, and Aldabra on the Seychelles.

== Taxonomy and systematics ==
The Malagasy sacred ibis was formerly considered a subspecies of the African sacred ibis. It is now however classified as a separate species from the African sacred ibis due to considerable differences observed in the former's ecology and morphology. It is hypothesized that the Malagasy sacred ibis evolved from the African sacred ibis when the latter supposedly spread to and colonized Madagascar from mainland Africa.

There are two different subspecies of the Malagasy sacred ibis: Threskiornis bernieri bernieri (Bonaparte, 1855) on Madagascar, and T. b. abbotti (Ridgway, 1893) on Aldabra in the Seychelles.

== Description ==
The adult stands 65–89 cm (26–35 in) tall, with a wingspan of 112–124 cm (44–49 in). The plumage is predominantly white, often with brownish-yellow staining. There are also black ornamental plumes on the back with a blue or green gloss formed from the lower scapulars and tertials, which are most prominent in the breeding season. The bill, head, neck and legs are black.

This ibis is morphologically similar to the African sacred ibis, but is slightly smaller, more slender-billed, lacks the black trailing edge to the wings, has bluish-slate tertials (purplish-slate in the African sacred ibis), differently structured ornamental neck sacs, less developed ornamental plumes and a different display. Unlike the African sacred ibis, there is also little or no black on the wing tips and duller display plumes from the innermost secondaries.

Both the bernieri and abbotti race have a light blue or white iris, both of which differ markedly from the brown iris of the African sacred ibis. The abbotti race also has a black wing stripe. Although this ibis is unlikely to be confused with other species in the field, it may sometimes be mistaken for the African sacred ibis which may occasionally visit Madagascar as a vagrant.

The juvenile appears similar to the adult, but the head and neck are feathered black with white streaks, the ornamental plumes on the back are absent, and there may be some black on the wing tips.

It is generally non-vocal, but the voice is probably similar to that of the African Sacred Ibis.

== Distribution and habitat ==
Apart from its occurrence on Aldabra, the Malagasy sacred ibis is sparsely distributed along and restricted to the west coast of Madagascar, especially between Port-Berge and Moromoe. Although uncommon, some high densities of resident breeding populations have been observed in mangroves and estuaries near Soalala and Sahamalaza Bay and Baie de Baly; the region encompassed between these locations appears to be a species' stronghold.

The Malagasy sacred ibis is generally restricted to coastal mudflats, estuaries, mangrove swamps and shallow brackish coastal lakes; but is occasionally found on freshwater wetlands. It preferentially frequents wide, open pools without surrounding vegetation; as well as sand bars and sandy beaches for general resting places. In one survey, over 80% of individuals recorded were found within 2 km (1.2 mi) of the coastline. Its habitat is situated 0–191 m (0–627 ft) above sea level. This species is considered more ecologically restricted than its mainland African counterpart (Threskiornis aethiopicus), which is found in a wider range of habitats at a wider range of altitudes.

== Ecology ==
=== Feeding ===
The Malagasy sacred ibis feeds on crustaceans, diverse invertebrates, vegetable refuse and more occasionally takes frogs, reptiles and young birds. It forages mainly on mud in tidal areas, thrusting its bill into the mud up to the eyes. The abbotti race on the Seychelles feeds in coral pools and along lagoon shores (King, 1981 in Hancock). Feeding is often solitary, although some individuals have been observed foraging in pairs or threes.

=== Breeding ===
Egg-laying occurs at the beginning of the wet season in November and December. The clutch size is usually 2 eggs. Average egg measurements for T. a. abbotti have been reported as 59.5 mm (2.34 in) long and 41.3 mm (1.63 in) broad and weighing 55 g (1.9 oz).

This ibis nests colonially, sometimes with mixed heron species such as the Humblot's heron or egret species such as cattle egret and dimorphic egret. The nest lies 2–3 m (6 ft 7 in – 9 ft 10 in) above the surface of the water in forks of Avicennia and Rhizophora trees and largely comprises twigs, some of which are still living with leaves attached. The nest is structurally sturdy and measures 45–50 cm (18–20 in) across and 25 cm (9.8 in) deep. Other nests have been reported to be smaller, measuring approximately 25 cm (9.8 in) across.

=== Threats and survival ===
The Madagascan population has been markedly declining mainly through unsustainable harvesting of eggs, nest site disturbance and wetland habitat degradation. Human interference and habitat loss also pose threats to the abbotti race. Because nesting individuals are apparently fearless of humans, this species is an easy target for hunters. Habitat loss and degradation pose another serious threat to the population. Important areas of this species' habitat are threatened with pollution, sedimentation and encroachment of alluvial sands. Such sedimentation is caused by soil erosion from slash and burn cultivation (Birdlife International, 2013). Its mangrove habitat is also threatened with destruction for charcoal production. This ibis may further be in competition for food with egret species such as the dimorphic egret.

Because this ibis has historically been widely considered conspecific with the African sacred ibis, no early separate conservation measures have been proposed for the former. Coastal sites are generally poorly protected in western Madagascar, although new wetland conservation initiatives now include the species as a conservation target. On the Seychelles, the Aldabra atoll has been designated a Special Reserve.

== In culture and relationship to humans ==
This species has been popularly hunted and its eggs harvested for food by local villagers, and young nestlings have even been raised to serve as food for seasonal events. This ibis is easily captured because of its passiveness and incautiousness when feeding and nesting.

Two Malagasy sacred ibis individuals were once received by London Zoo from the Societe d'Acclimatation, Paris, in 1870.

== Status ==
The Madagascan population size has been estimated at 1200–2500 individuals, and the population of the abbotti race on Aldabra has been estimated at 300–750 individuals, with a total estimated population of 2,600–3,250 individuals. Its estimated global range is 25,500 km^{2} (9,800 sq mi). The species' global population is estimated to have declined by 50 – 70% over the last 32 years, most of which has probably occurred in recent decades. The Malagasy sacred ibis has therefore been classified as Endangered by the IUCN and is generally considered rare throughout its range. Historical accounts suggest that it was once more common.
