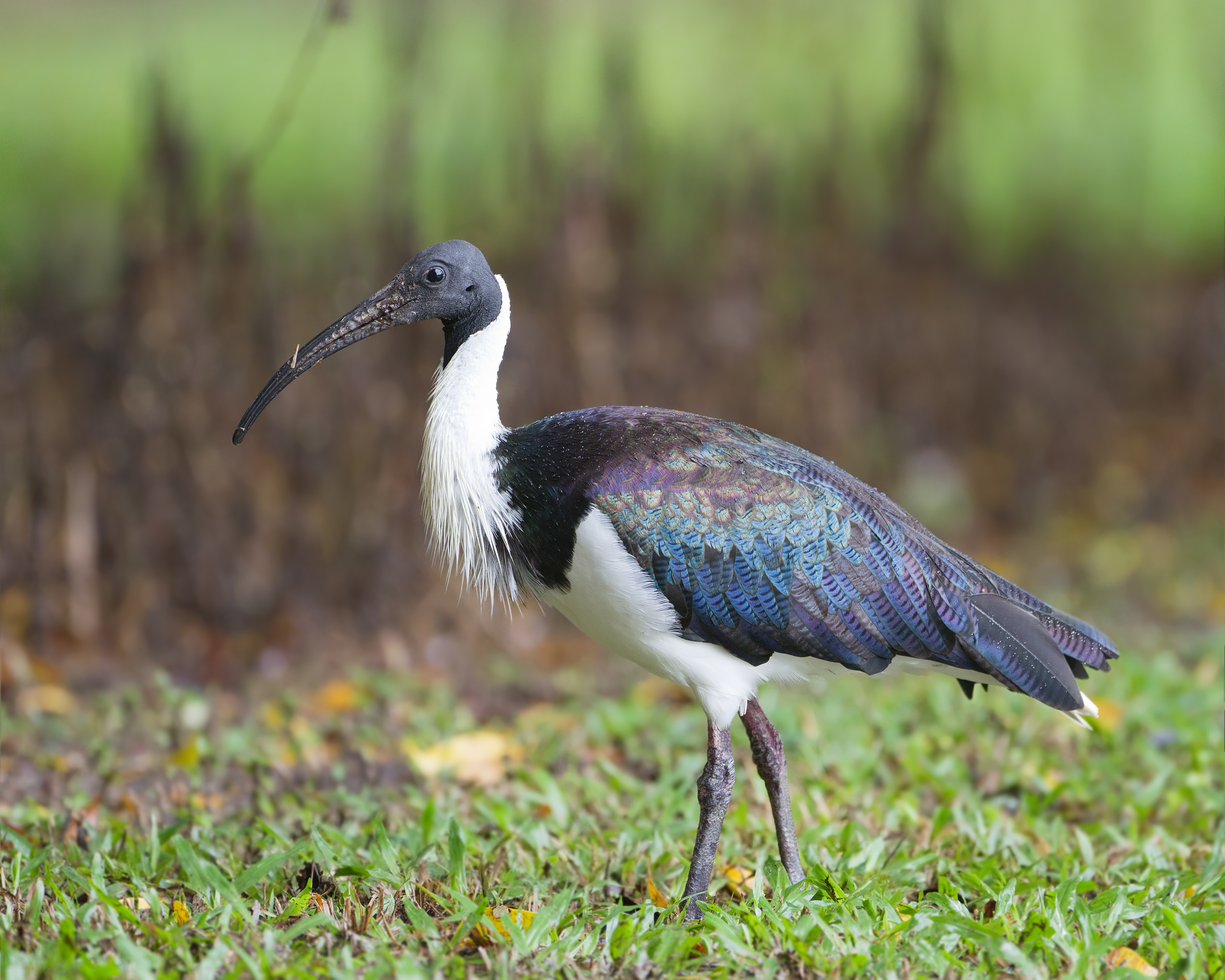
- Adult in Queensland

Conservation status
- Least Concern (IUCN 3.1)

Scientific classification
- Kingdom: Animalia
- Phylum: Chordata
- Class: Aves
- Order: Pelecaniformes
- Family: Threskiornithidae
- Genus: Threskiornis
- Species: T. spinicollis

Binomial name
- Threskiornis spinicollis (Jameson, 1835)

= Straw-necked ibis =

Species of bird

The straw-necked ibis (Threskiornis spinicollis) is a bird of the ibis and spoonbill family Threskiornithidae. It can be found throughout Australia, New Guinea, and parts of Indonesia. Adults have distinctive straw-like feathers on their necks.

== Description ==
Straw-necked ibises are large birds, around 59–76 cm (23–30 in) long, with a bare black head and a long, downcurved black bill. They have a distinctive, highly iridescent plumage, which can appear fairly uniform dirty dark brown in indifferent light; the wings are dark, with an iridescent, multicoloured sheen in sunlight. They have a shiny blue-black back, with a metallic purple, green and bronze glow, and a dark collar. The upper neck is white, as are the underparts and the undertail; their legs are usually red near the top and dark grey toward the feet. Adults have straw-colored feathers on the neck, giving the bird its common name. Their wingspan is about 100–120 cm (39.5–47 in) and weight is generally 1.1–1.5 kg (2.5–3.5 lb).

Sexes are similar, although males have longer bills and females have a dark band across their upper breast. Juveniles have duller colors and shorter bills with less curvature, and lack the straw-like plumes on the neck.

== Distribution and habitat ==
Straw-necked ibises are commonly found throughout Australia, nesting at least occasionally in all mainland states and territories, except in the arid interior. They are most abundant on the east coast, and are vagrant to New Zealand, Norfolk Island and Lord Howe Island. They are less frequently seen in New Guinea, Indonesia, and occasionally in Tasmania and other islands of the Bass Strait.

Found around shallow freshwater wetlands, cultivated pastures, edges of swamps and lagoons, and wet or dry grasslands. They tend to avoid arid and saltwater areas, and coastal mudflats. They are extremely nomadic, and are constantly on the move searching for suitable habitats. They are frequently seen standing on high branches of bare trees, silhouetted against the sky.

== Behaviour ==
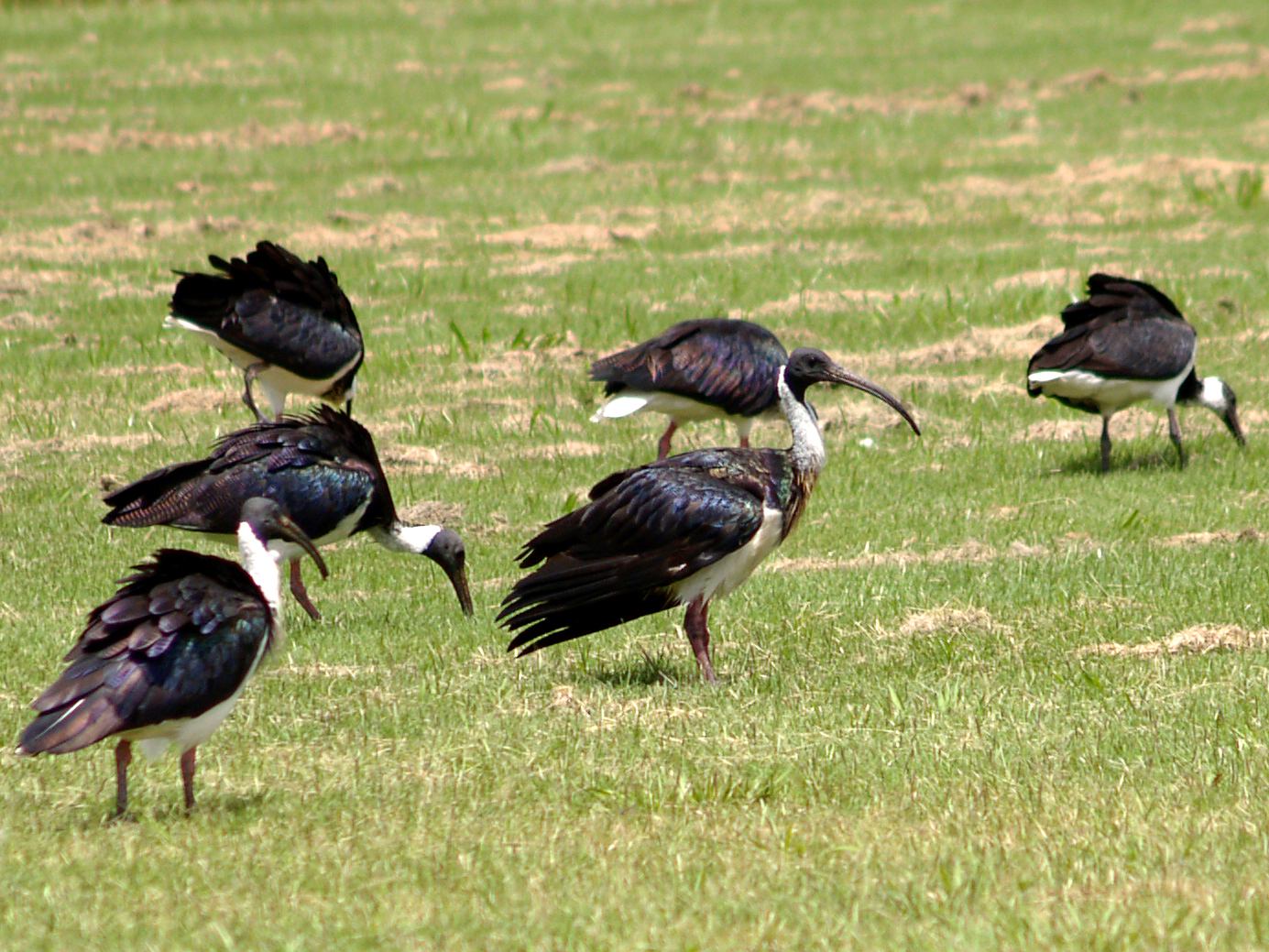
Straw-necked ibis flock

Straw-neck ibises are partly migratory: some birds are sedentary, while others make seasonal or erratic movements when water conditions vary. Seasonal migrations are recorded from south-eastern and northern Australia, as well as from coast and inland wetlands in central Australia, and across the Torres Strait between north-eastern Australia and southern New Guinea. Non-breeding migrants arrive in western Australia and leave in autumn, the arrival dates are closely correlated with rainfall during the preceding spring. They typically fly in line or in V formation, reaching high altitudes during long-distance movements.

Vocalizations are made mainly around breeding colonies; calls are composed of croaks, barks and grunts. In flight, at intervals, they may produce a hoarse grunt. They feed in flocks of up to 200 birds; they probe in soil, mud, crevices, vegetation or shallow water.

== Diet ==
Straw-necked ibises feed primarily on aquatic and terrestrial invertebrates, although their diets can vary. In shallow waters, straw-necked ibises feed on aquatic insects, molluscs, frogs, freshwater crayfish (Cherax) and fish. On land, they thrive on insects such as grasshoppers, crickets, and locusts, and are often called the Farmer's Friend because they eat pests that would otherwise eat farm crops. They also eat skinks and other small lizards, and small reptiles, as well as rodents.

Compared to the Australian white ibis, they have not adapted to a wide variety of food and are only rarely opportunistic scavengers of human waste. Citizen scientists have reported seeing them eat cane toads (Bufo marinus), avoiding being poisoned by flicking the toads about until they release the toxin which is their defence mechanism, then taking them to a creek to wash them

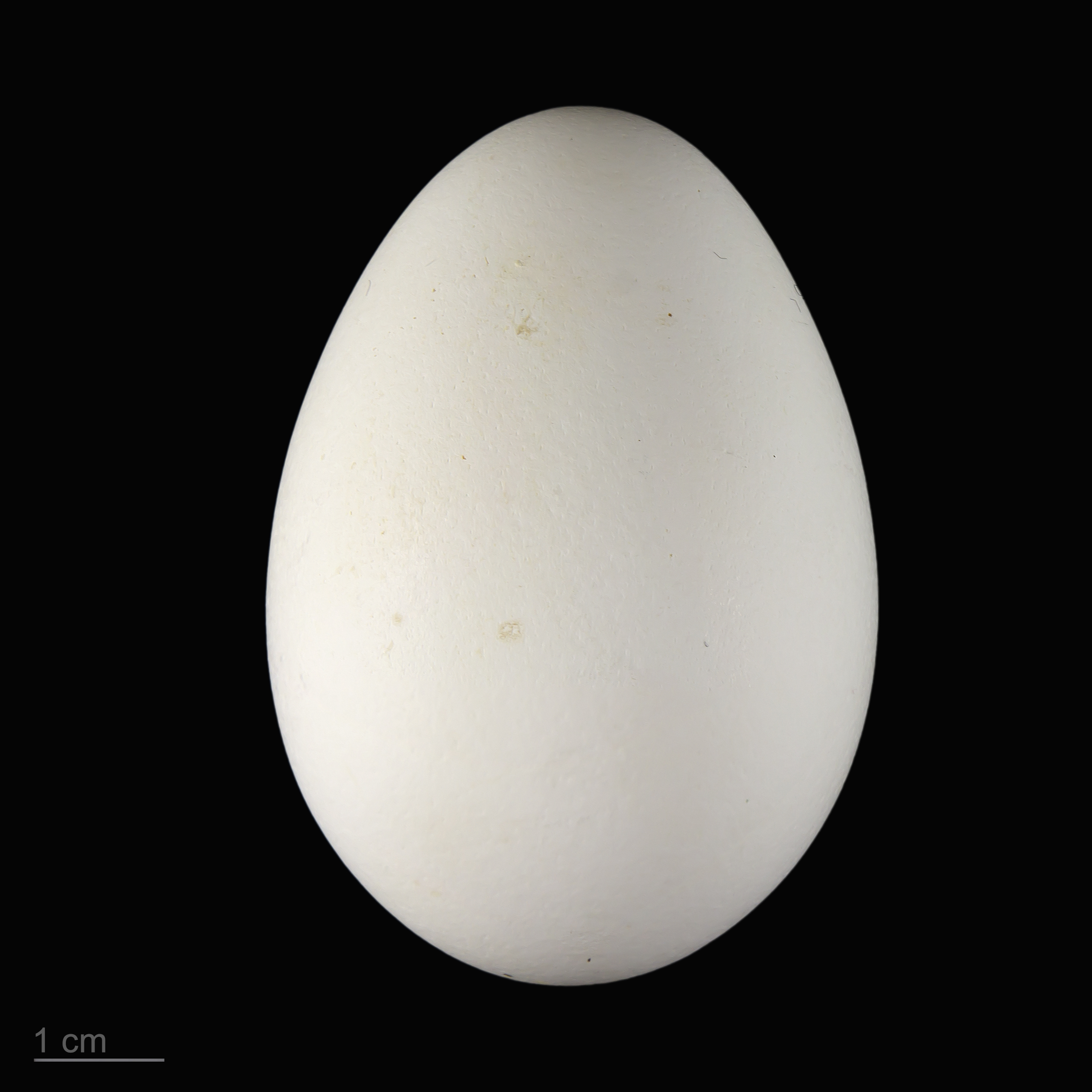
Threskiornis spinicollis egg - MHNT

== Reproduction ==
Breeding season is highly variable, mainly influenced by water conditions. In southwestern Australia, it normally occurs from August to December; occasional breeding takes place in the north, but on a very small scale. Breeding has been observed for all months throughout the central and northern regions, usually occurring over the year following heavy rain in some areas.

They build a large, rough, cup-shaped nest of sticks and trampled plants among reeds, paperbarks, bulrushes, or trees over water. They breed in colonies, often with the Australian white ibis. Nests are used year after year. Clutches vary from 2–5 eggs, with an incubation period of around 24 to 25 days, by both parents. Both parents feed and care for the young, about 35 days after hatching. Feeding is by regurgitation and continues up to two weeks after leaving the nest.
