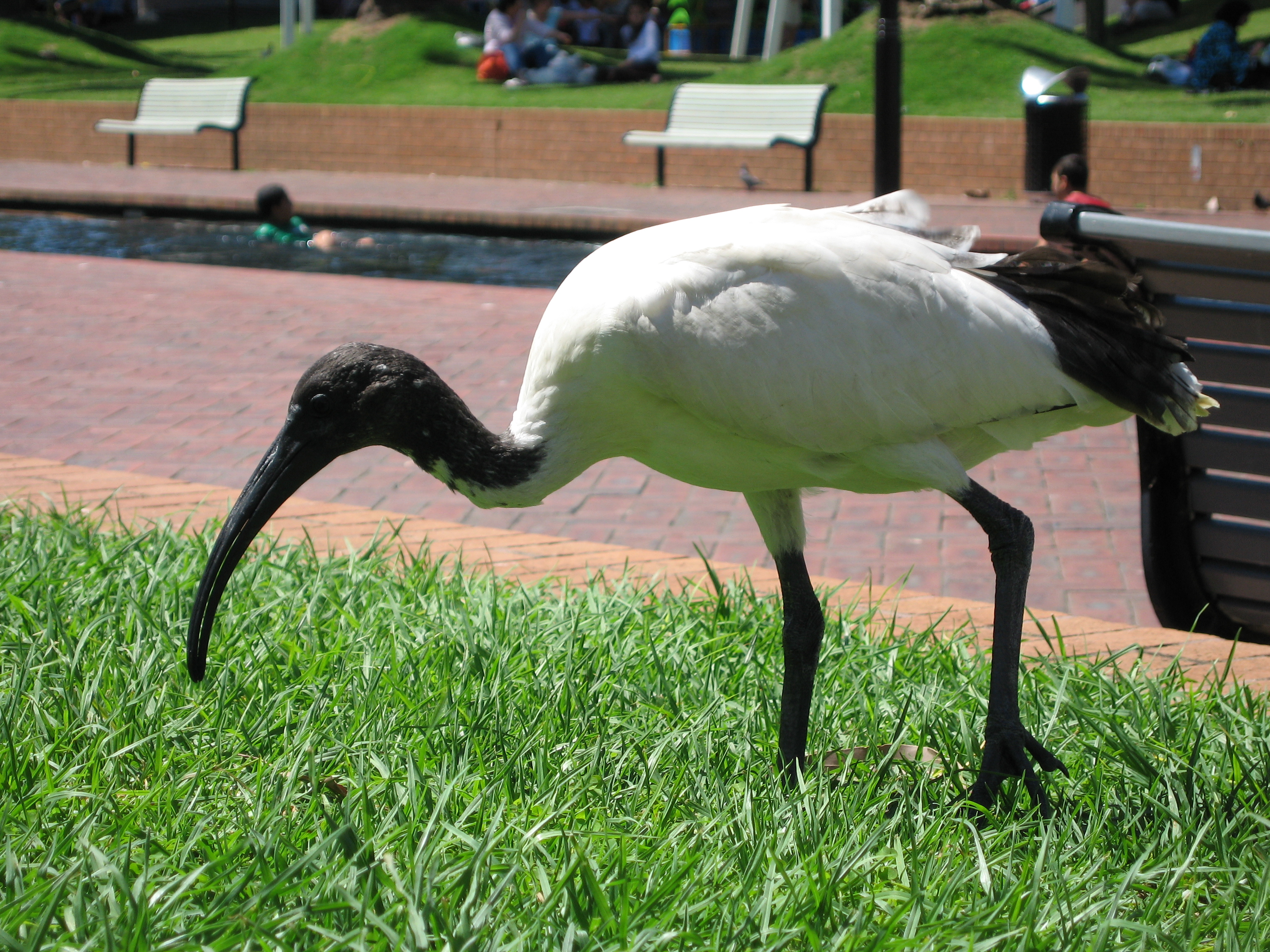
- Australian white ibis, Darling Harbour, Sydney

Scientific classification
- Kingdom: Animalia
- Phylum: Chordata
- Class: Aves
- Order: Pelecaniformes
- Family: Threskiornithidae
- Subfamily: Threskiornithinae
- Genus: Threskiornis; G.R. Gray, 1842

Type species
- Tantalus aethiopicus Latham, 1790

Species
- T. aethiopicus T. bernieri T. melanocephalus T. molucca †T. solitarius T. spinicollis

= Threskiornis =

Genus of birds

Threskiornis is a genus of ibises, wading birds of the family Threskiornithidae. They occur in the warmer parts of the Old World in southern Asia, Australasia and Sub-Saharan Africa. They are colonial breeders, which build a stick nest in a tree or bush and lay two to four eggs. They occur in marshy wetlands and feed on various fish, frogs, crustaceans and insects. In English, they are called sacred ibises. In Australia, urban dwelling ibises are known colloquially as "bin chickens".

== Description ==
Adult Threskiornis ibises are typically 75 cm long and have white body plumage. The bald head, neck and legs are black. The bill is thick and curved. Sexes are similar, but juveniles have whiter necks duller plumage. The straw-necked ibis differs from the other species in having dark upperparts, and is some times placed in the separate genus Carphibis (Jameson, 1835) as Carphibis spinicollis. A flightless species, the Reunion ibis, became extinct in the 18th century.

== Species ==
Image	Scientific name	Common name	Distribution
	T. aethiopicus	African sacred ibis	Sub-Saharan Africa, southeastern Iraq, and formerly in Egypt
	T. bernieri	Malagasy sacred ibis	Madagascar
	T. melanocephalus	Black-headed ibis	Northern India, Bangladesh, Nepal and Sri Lanka east up to Japan
	T. moluccus	Australian white ibis	Eastern, northern and south-western Australia
	T. spinicollis	Straw-necked ibis	Australia (except parts of Western Australia, South Australia, and south-west Tasmania), Indonesia and New Guinea
	T. solitarius †	Reunion ibis	Extinct, lived on Réunion island
