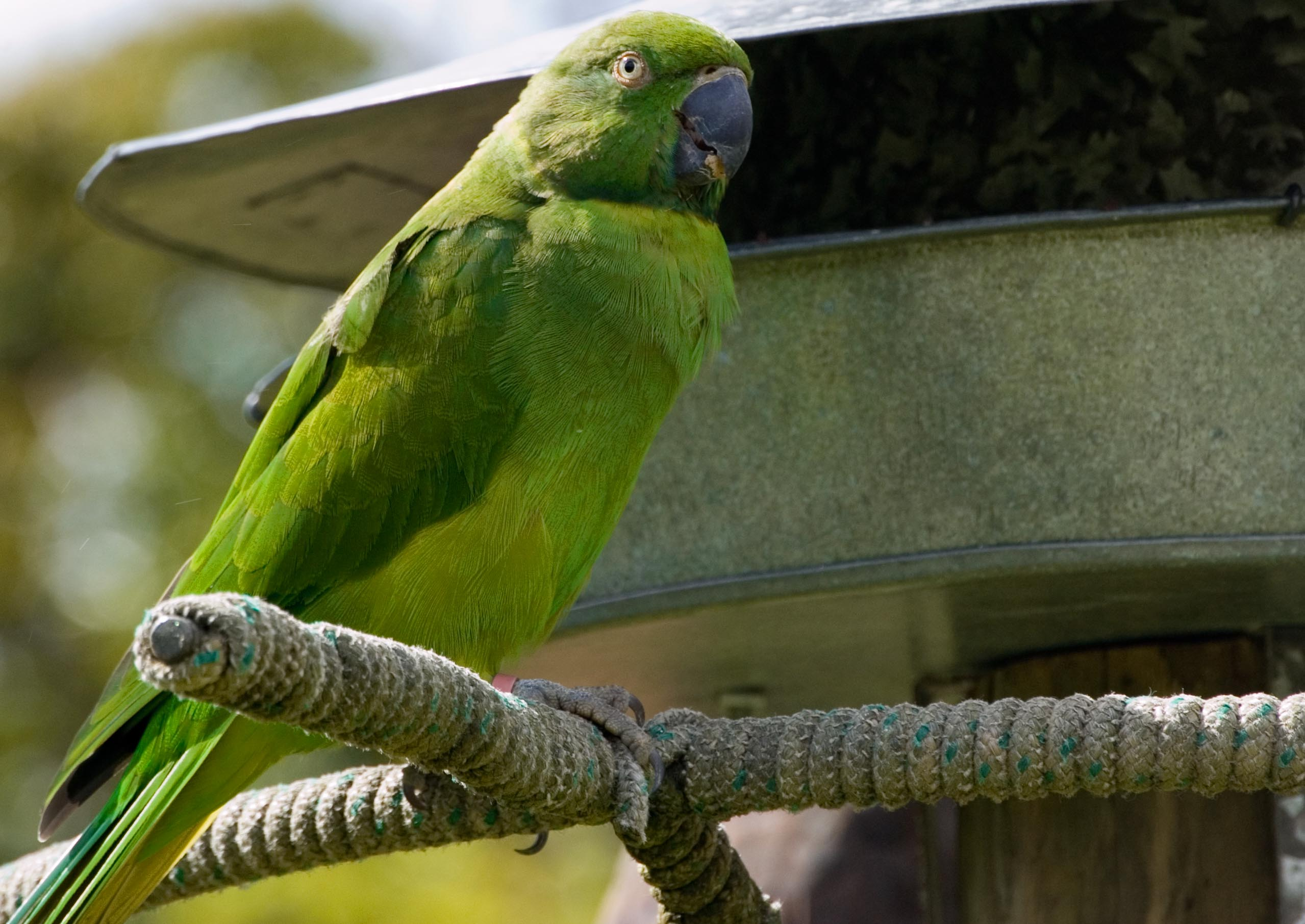
- Female by a feeding hopper

Conservation status
- Vulnerable (IUCN 3.1)
- CITES Appendix I

Scientific classification
- Kingdom: Animalia
- Phylum: Chordata
- Class: Aves
- Order: Psittaciformes
- Family: Psittaculidae
- Genus: Psittacula
- Species: P. eques

Binomial name
- Psittacula eques (Boddaert, 1783)

Subspecies
- P. e. eques (Boddaert, 1783); P. e. echo (Newton & Newton, 1876)
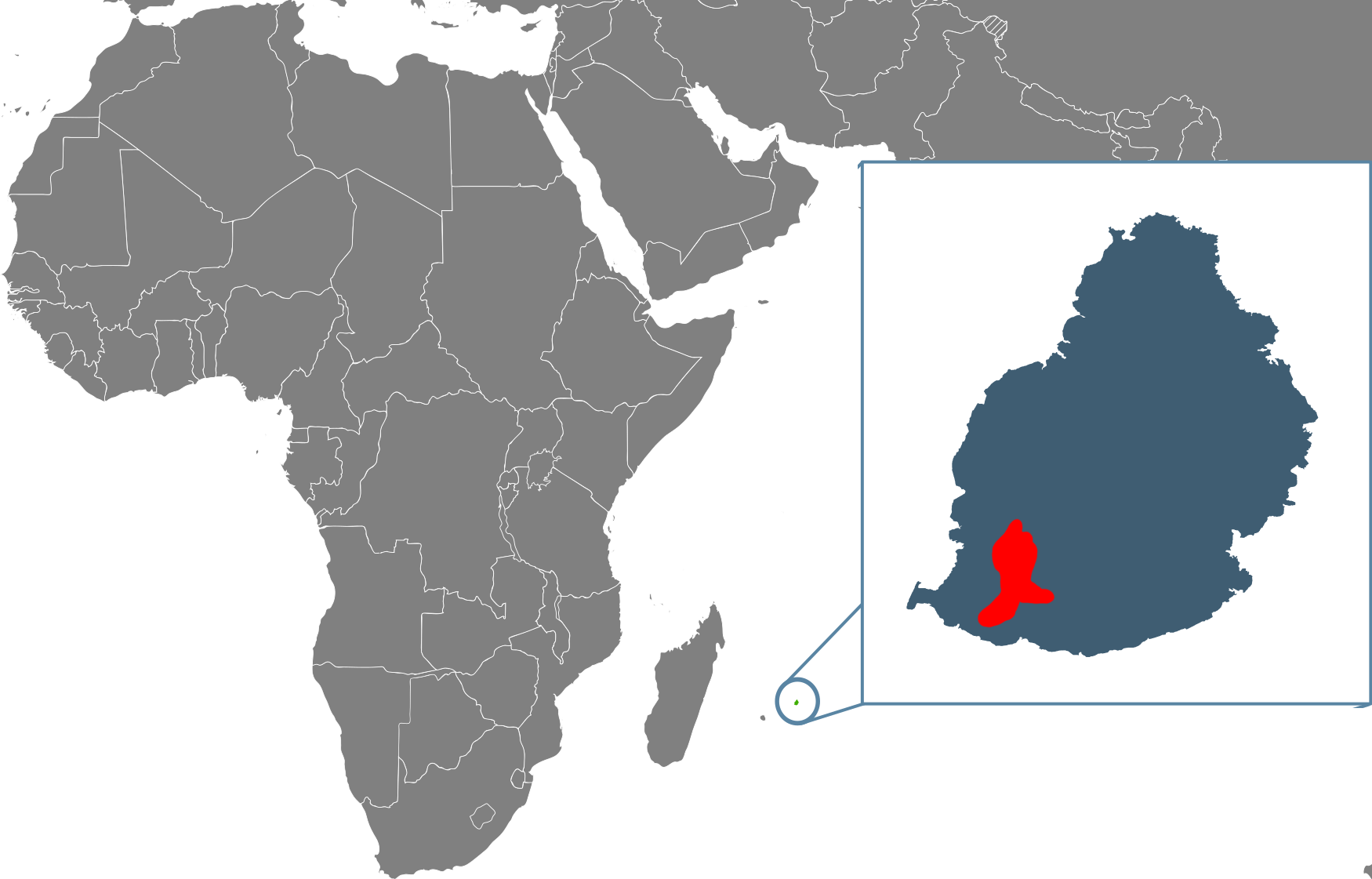
- Current range (red) in Mauritius

Synonyms
- List: Psittacus eques Boddaert, 1783; Psittica torquata Latham, 1822; Palaeornis echo Newton & Newton, 1876; Psittacula krameri echo Peters, 1937

= Echo parakeet =

Species of parrot endemic to Mauritius

The echo parakeet (Psittacula eques) is a species of parrot endemic to the Mascarene Islands of Mauritius and formerly Réunion. It is the only living native parrot of the Mascarene Islands; all others have become extinct due to human activity. Two subspecies have been recognised: the extinct Réunion parakeet (for a long time known only from descriptions and illustrations) and the living echo parakeet, sometimes known as the Mauritius parakeet. The relationship between the two populations has been historically disputed. A 2015 DNA study compared the DNA of echo parakeets with a skin sample thought to be from a Réunion parakeet and determined them to be subspecies of the same species. However, it has also been suggested they did not constitute different subspecies. As it was named first, the binomial name of the Réunion parakeet is used for the species; the Réunion subspecies thereby became P. eques eques, while the Mauritius subspecies became P. eques echo. Their closest relative was the extinct Newton's parakeet of Rodrigues, and the three are grouped among the subspecies of the rose-ringed parakeet (from which they diverged) of Asia and Africa.

The echo parakeet is 34–42 cm (13–17 in) long, weighs 167–193 g (5.9–6.8 oz), and its wingspan is 49–54 cm (19–21 in). It is generally green (the female is darker overall) and has two collars on the neck; the male has one black and one pink collar, and the female has one green and one indistinct black collar. The upper bill of the male is red and the lower blackish brown; the female's upper bill is black. The skin around the eyes is orange and the feet are grey. Juveniles have a red-orange bill, which turns black after they fledge, and immature birds are similar to the female. The Réunion parakeet had a complete pink collar around the neck, whereas it tapers out at the back in the Mauritius subspecies. The related rose-ringed parakeet which has been introduced to Mauritius is similar, though slightly different in colouration and smaller. The echo parakeet has a wide range of vocalisations, the most common sounding like "chaa-chaa, chaa-chaa".

As the species is limited to forests with native vegetation, it is largely restricted to the Black River Gorges National Park in the southwest of Mauritius. It is arboreal and keeps to the canopy, where it feeds and rests. It nests in natural cavities in old trees, and clutches usually consist of two to four white eggs. The female incubates the eggs, while the male feeds her, and the young are brooded by the female. Not all pairs are strictly monogamous, as breeding between females and "auxiliary males" is known to occur. The echo parakeet mainly feeds on the fruits and leaves of native plants, though it has been observed to feed on introduced plants. The Réunion parakeet probably went extinct due to hunting and deforestation, and was last reported in 1732. The echo parakeet was also hunted by early visitors to Mauritius and due to destruction and alteration of its native habitat, its numbers declined throughout the 20th century, reaching as few as eight to 12 in the 1980s, when it was referred to as "the world's rarest parrot". An intensive effort of captive breeding beginning in the 1990s saved the bird from extinction; the species was downgraded from critically endangered to endangered in 2007, and the population had reached 750 birds by 2019, whereafter it was classified as vulnerable.

== Taxonomy ==
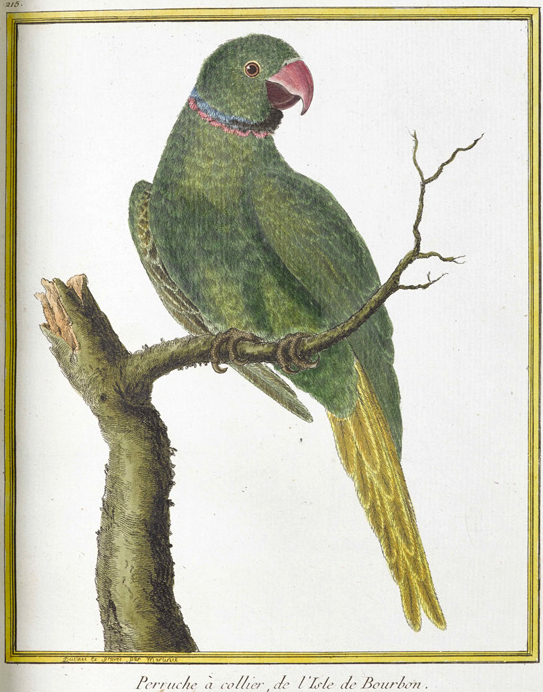
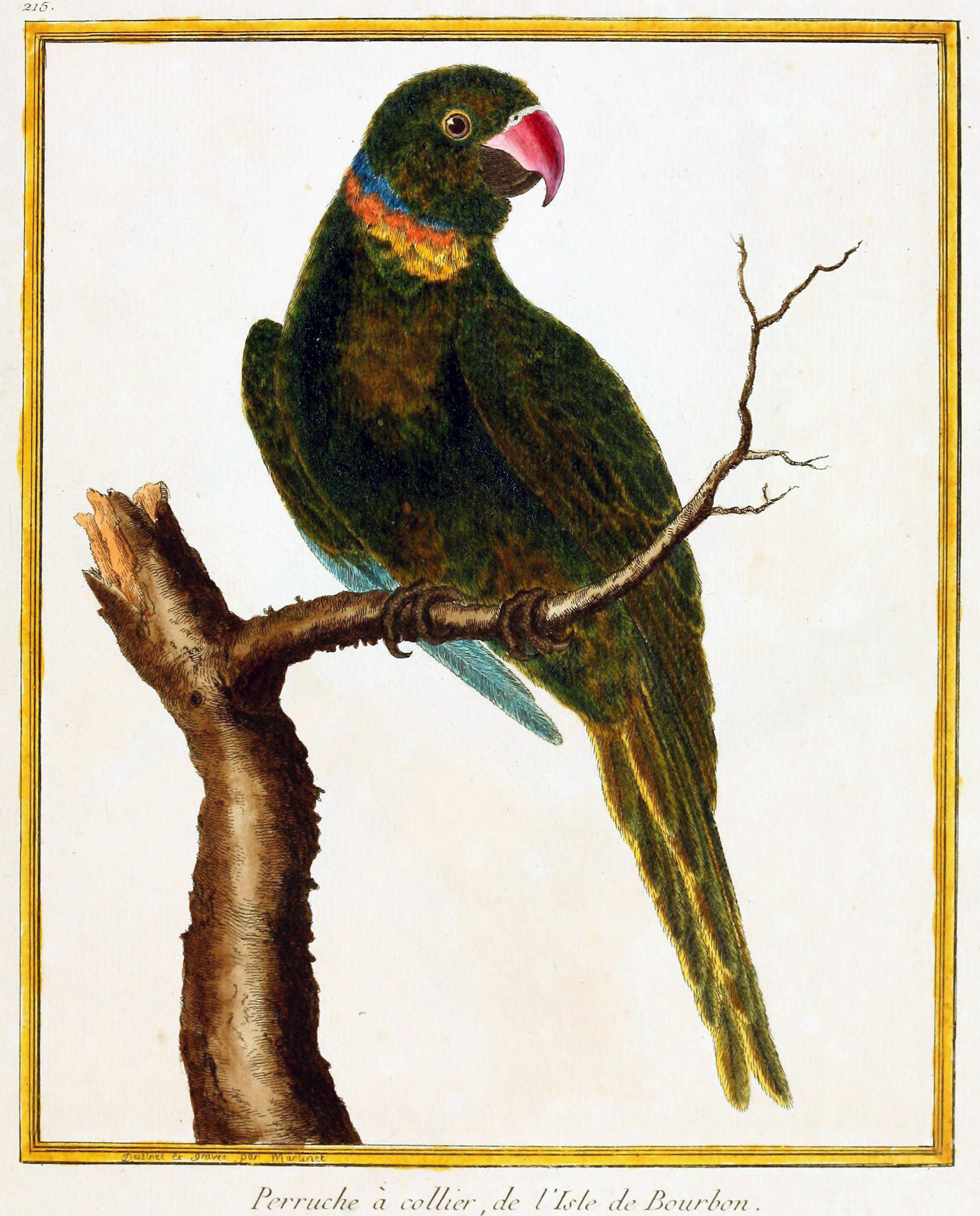
Copies of a plate of P. eques, depicting a male of the extinct Réunion parakeet, by François-Nicolas Martinet, 1770–1783. While the plate has been considered the type illustration of the species, major differences between hand-coloured copies mean it may not be adequate for this purpose.

Green parakeets were mentioned in the accounts of early travelers to the Mascarene Islands of Réunion and Mauritius. They were first recorded on Réunion in 1674 by the French traveler Sieur Dubois, and on Mauritius in 1732 by the French engineer Jean-François Charpentier de Cossigny. The green parakeets of Réunion were referred to as perruche à double collier ("double-collared parakeet") by the French naturalists Mathurin Jacques Brisson, in 1760, Comte de Buffon, in 1770–1783, and François Levaillant, in 1801–1805, who described them from specimens that reached France. In 1783, the Dutch naturalist Pieter Boddaert coined the scientific name Psittacus eques, based on a plate by the French artist François-Nicolas Martinet, which accompanied Buffon's account of the Réunion bird in his work Histoire Naturelle. The specific name eques is Latin for "horseman", and refers to the military colours of a French cavalryman. Martinet's plate was drawn after a specimen that was part of the collection in the Cabinet Aubry in Paris, and the plate is the type illustration. Whether the contemporary illustrations were based on live or stuffed specimens is unknown; though as all show different poses, this suggests several specimens existed if they were mounted. Neither is it clear if the descriptions from France were based on different or the same imported specimens nor how many reached Europe. Levaillant knew of two specimens, and as many as five may have existed.

The green parakeets of Mauritius and Réunion were usually treated together in historical literature, and their histories have consequently been muddled. In 1822, the British ornithologist John Latham listed the parakeet of Réunion (and "other parts of the same latitude") as a variety of the rose-ringed parakeet, which he referred to as Psittica torquata, based on a name coined by Brisson. In 1876, the British ornithologists and brothers Alfred and Edward Newton pointed out that the avifauna of Réunion and Mauritius were generally distinct from each other, and that this might, therefore, also be true of the parakeets. They suggested the new name Palaeornis echo for the Mauritian species (referring to Echo, a nymph in Greek mythology), while noting that it was very similar to the by-then extinct Réunion species (which retained the name Palaeornis eques). The Italian ornithologist Tommaso Salvadori united the two again in 1891, while giving only Mauritius as the habitat. In 1907, British zoologist Walter Rothschild supported the separation of the two species on account of the other birds of Réunion and Mauritius being distinct, while noting that how they differed was unknown. The American ornithologist James L. Peters listed the parakeet of Mauritius as a subspecies of the rose-ringed parakeet (Psittacula krameri) in 1937; P. k. echo. He thereby replaced the genus name Palaeornis with Psittacula, wherein he also classified other extant parakeets of Asia and Africa. In 1967, the American ornithologist James Greenway considered the parakeets of both Mauritius and Réunion to be subspecies of the rose-ringed parakeet, and found it probable that they differed from each other, unless the birds on Réunion had simply been introduced, though how was unknown.

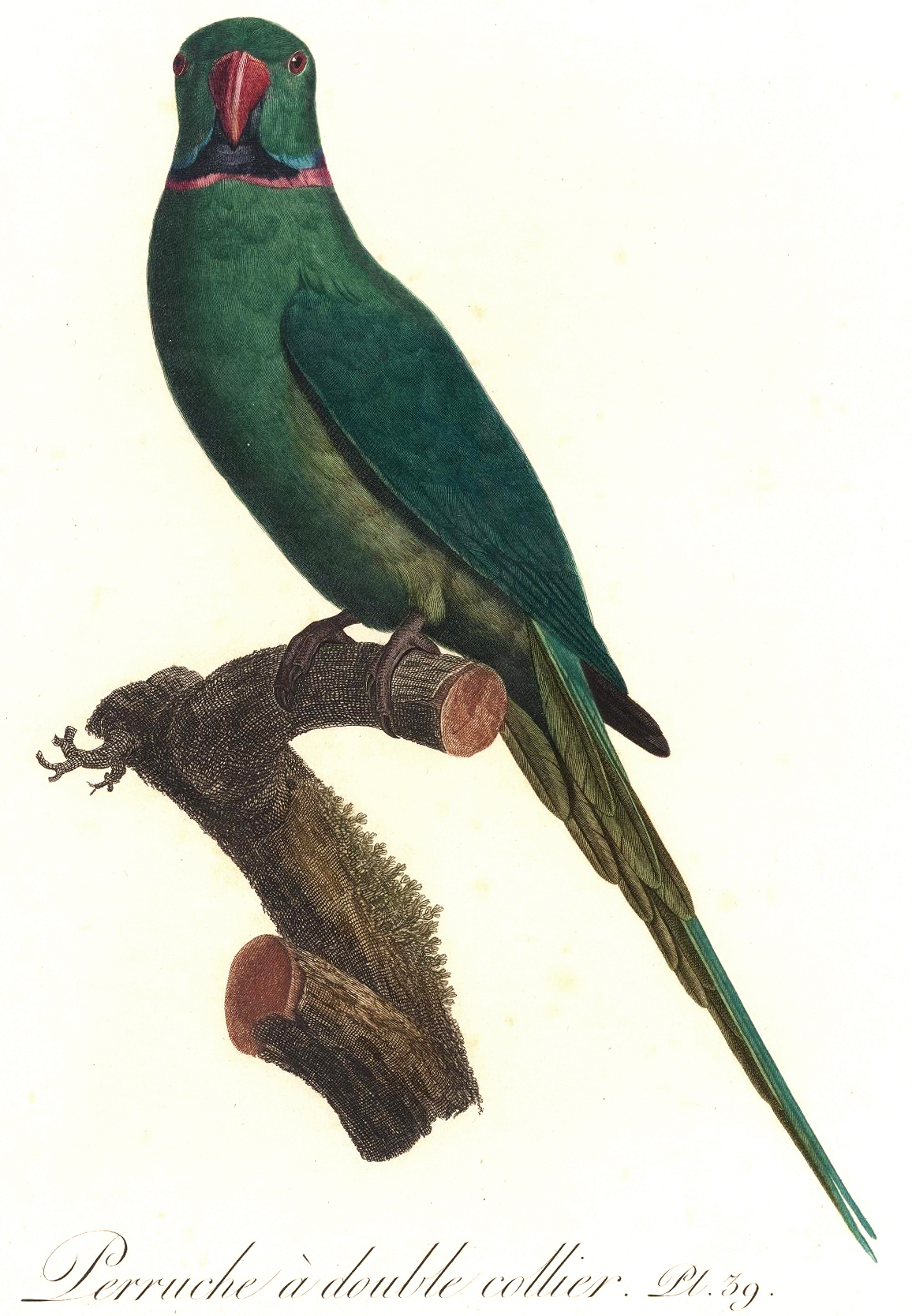
Illustration of a male Réunion parakeet by Jacques Barraband, 1801–1805

In a 1987 book about Mascarene birds, the British ecologist Anthony S. Cheke stated that the parakeets of Mauritius and Réunion apparently belonged to the same species. In the same publication (a chapter which was one of the few studies of echo parakeet biology), British conservation biologist Carl G. Jones noted that the parakeets of the western Indian Ocean were probably derived from Indian Alexandrine parakeets (P. eupatria), losing the characteristics of that bird the farther they dispersed. Jones also reported an old parakeet skin, possibly from Réunion, in the Royal Museum of Scotland, Edinburgh (a study skin catalogued as specimen NMS.Z 1929.186.2). Originally part of the collection of the French taxidermist Louis Dufresne, it was bought by the University Museum of Edinburgh (which later became the Royal Museum) in 1819, along with the rest of his natural-history collection. The specimen's original label referred specifically to Levaillant's plate of the "perruche a double collier", illustrated by the French artist Jacques Barraband, which was meant to depict the parakeet of Réunion. Jones cautioned that the collection data of such early specimens may not always be reliable, and that the skin could possibly have come from Mauritius, instead. Whether the Edinburgh skin was the basis of Martinet's type illustration is unknown. Jones did not find the skin particularly different from those of living echo parakeets (or the old French descriptions), based on examination of photographs. He agreed with previous authors that the parakeets of Mauritius and Réunion belonged to the same species (P. eques, the oldest name), but that they should be kept separate at the subspecific level (as P. eques eques and P. eques echo), due to lack of further information about the extinct bird.

The living parakeet of Mauritius has been referred to by the English common name "echo parakeet" since the 1970s, based on the scientific name, and has also been called the Mauritius parakeet. The local Mauritian name is cateau vert, kato, or katover (derived from French). The Réunion population has been referred to as the Réunion parakeet and the Réunion ring-necked parakeet, but has also been subsumed under the common name of the echo parakeet.

=== Evolution ===
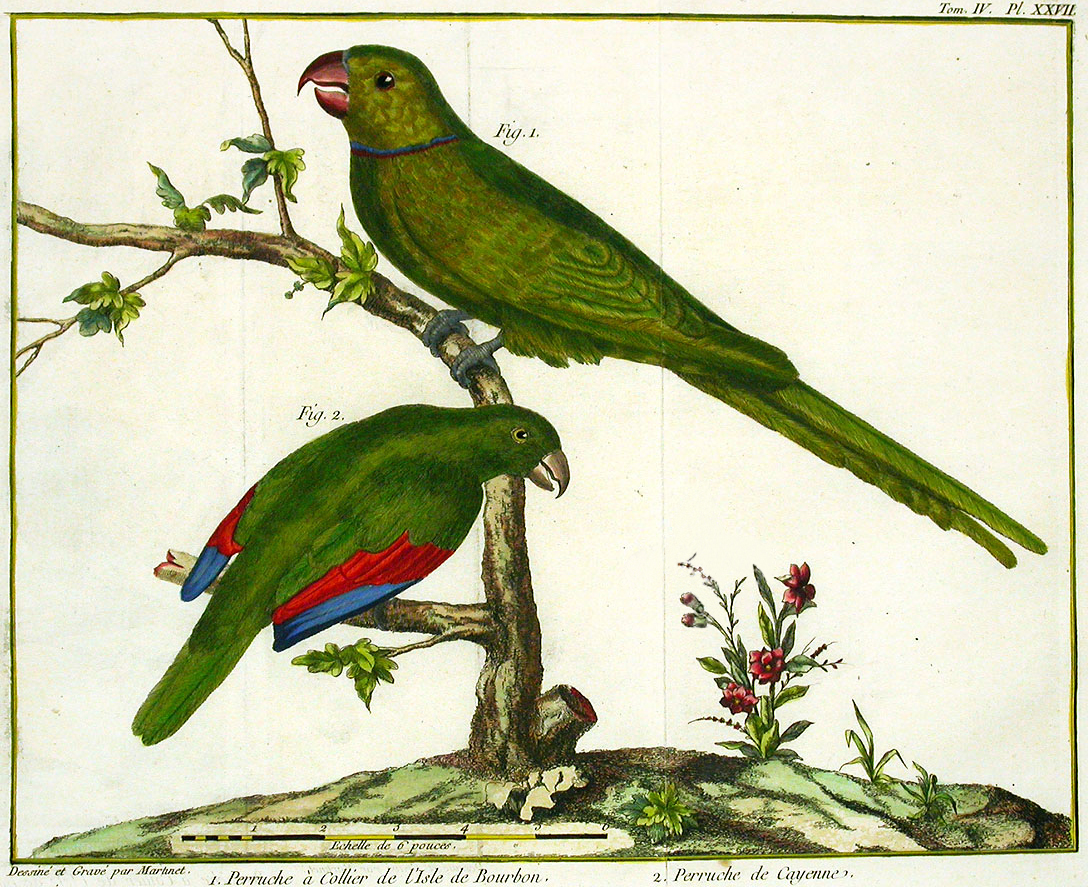
Illustration of a male Réunion parakeet (top) by Martinet, 1760

In 2004, British geneticist Jim J. Groombridge and colleagues examined the DNA of Psittacula parakeets to determine their evolutionary relationships, and found that the echo parakeet had diverged from the Indian subspecies of rose-ringed parakeet (P. k. borealis) rather than the African subspecies (P. k. krameri). They found that the echo parakeet diverged relatively recently compared to other Psittacula species, between 0.7 and 2.0 million years ago, which appears to coincide with volcanic inactivity on Mauritius between 0.6 and 2.1 million years ago. The ancestors of the echo parakeet may, therefore, have migrated southwards from India across the Indian Ocean, and arrived at the time the island was formed. The authors cautioned that their interpretations were limited by the absence of DNA from the extinct Seychelles parakeet (P. wardi) and Newton's parakeet (P. exsul) from other Indian Ocean islands.

In 2007, based on morphological evidence, British palaeontologist Julian P. Hume found the echo parakeet to be more closely related to the Alexandrine parakeet than to the rose-ringed parakeet. He noted that the skeletal anatomy of the echo parakeet was mainly known from fossil bones, as it was the Mauritian parrot most commonly found in cave deposits, and that skeletons are rare in museum collections. Hume pointed out that many birds endemic to the Mascarene Islands are derived from South Asian ancestors, and that a South Asian provenance was probable for the parrots, as well. Sea levels were lower during the Pleistocene, so species island hopping to the isolated islands was possible. In spite of most Mascarene parrots being poorly known, fossil remains show that they shared features such as enlarged heads and jaws, reduced pectoral elements, and robust leg elements. Hume suggested they shared a common origin within the Psittaculini radiation, based on morphological features and the fact that Psittacula parrots have managed to colonise many isolated islands in the Indian Ocean. In 2008, Cheke and Hume suggested that this group may have invaded the area several times, as many of the species were so specialised that they may have diverged on hot spot islands before the Mascarenes emerged from the sea.

A 2011 DNA study by British biologist Samit Kundu and colleagues found the echo parakeet samples grouped between two subspecies of the rose-ringed parakeet, P. k. krameri and P. k. borealis. They suggested that since some of the Indian Ocean island species had diverged early within their clades, including the echo parakeet within P. krameri, Africa and Asia may have been colonised from there rather than the other way around. They found the echo parakeet to have diverged between 3.7 and 6.8 million years ago, which, if correct, could imply that speciation had occurred before the formation of Mauritius. These researchers were unable to extract DNA from the Edinburgh specimen.

In 2015, British geneticist Hazel Jackson and colleagues managed to obtain DNA from a toe pad of the Edinburgh specimen and compare it with specimens from Mauritius. They found that within the P. krameri clade, Newton's parakeet from Rodrigues was ancestral to the Mauritius and Réunion parakeets, diverging from them 3.82 million years ago and that the latter two had diverged just 0.61 million years ago, differing by 0.2% from each other. The researchers concluded that the low level of divergence between the Mauritius and Réunion populations was consistent with them being distinct at the subspecific level. The following cladogram shows the phylogenetic position of the Mauritius and Réunion subspecies, according to Jackson and colleagues, 2015:

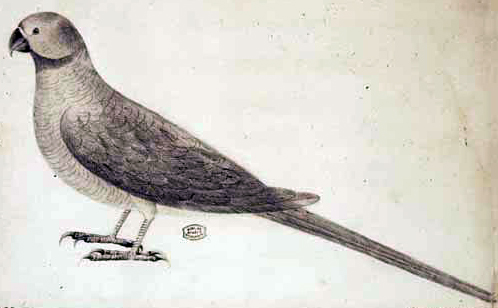
1770s illustration of the extinct Newton's parakeet, which was the closest relative of the echo parakeet

- - - - Psittacula krameri parvirostris (Abyssinian rose-ringed parakeet)
      - - Psittacula krameri manillensis (Indian rose-ringed parakeet)
        - Psittacula krameri borealis (Boreal rose-ringed parakeet)
    - - - Psittacula echo (Mauritius parakeet)
        - Psittacula eques (Réunion parakeet)
      - Psittacula exsul (Newton's parakeet)
  - Psittacula krameri krameri (African rose-ringed parakeet)

In 2018, the American ornithologist Kaiya L. Provost and colleagues found the Mascarene parrot (Mascarinus mascarinus) and Tanygnathus species to group within Psittacula, making that genus paraphyletic (an unnatural grouping), and stated this argued for breaking up the latter genus. To solve the issue, the German ornithologist Michael P. Braun and colleagues proposed in 2019 that Psittacula should be split into multiple genera. They placed the echo parakeet in the new genus Alexandrinus, along with its closest relatives, Newton's parakeet and the rose-ringed parakeet.

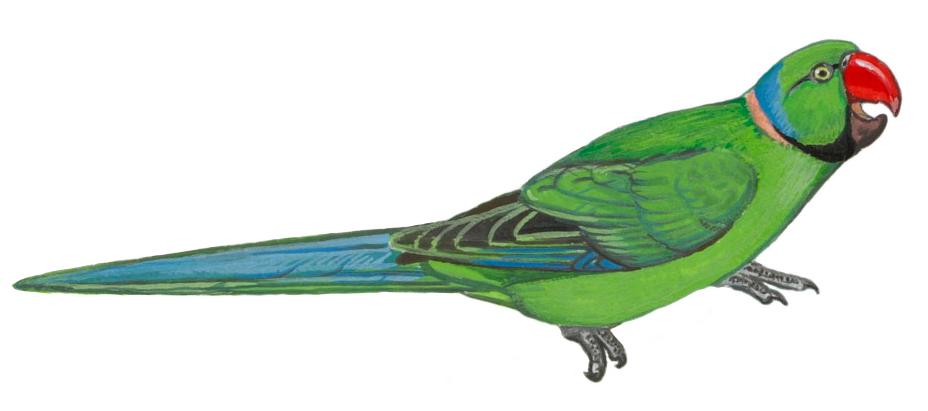
Life restoration of a male Réunion parakeet by Julian P. Hume; note complete pink collar

Cheke and the Dutch ornithologist Justin J. F. J. Jansen stated in 2016 that the Edinburgh specimen has no clear provenance information, and that it may have been collected from Mauritius (only one of Dufresne's other bird specimens was from Réunion, while several were from Mauritius). They noted that, unlike modern Mauritian specimens, the pink neck ring of the Edinburgh specimen continued uninterrupted around the back of the neck, similar to what Buffon and Levaillant described, but that from where the specimen Levaillant described was, was unclear. They stated that the genetic differences between the specimens were not necessarily subspecific, but because the Mauritian specimens were much more recent than the Edinburgh specimen, the similarity of the former specimens could have been due to a genetic bottleneck, resulting from a severe decline of the Mauritian population in the 19th century. They concluded that the default assumption should be that it came from Réunion. They also called attention to a usually overlooked, unlabelled sketch from around 1770 by French artist Paul Philippe Sanguin de Jossigny of a ring-necked parakeet with a collar encircling the neck, which they thought could have been from either island. In 2017, Hume agreed that the Edinburgh specimen could have come from Mauritius. He stated that the genetic differences could be due to variation within the population there, and pointed out that some other bird species migrate between Mauritius and Réunion.

Also in 2017, Australian ornithologist Joseph M. Forshaw agreed that the Mauritius and Réunion populations were subspecifically distinct and that the Edinburgh specimen was from Réunion, and should be designated the neotype of P. eques. The following year, Jones and colleagues, including authors of the DNA studies, Hume, and Forshaw, supported the identification of the Edinburgh specimen as a Réunion parakeet and the subspecific differentiation between the populations. They found that the specimen differed from all examined Mauritius specimens in having a complete pink collar, instead of having a gap at the back of the neck, a feature emphasised by Brisson, Buffon, and Levaillant in their descriptions of the Réunion parakeet, but not obvious in the photographs seen by Jones in the 1980s. Since populations on islands usually have lower genetic diversity than those on continents, they stated that the low level of differentiation between the Mauritius and Réunion specimens would be expected. They found it possible that Jossigny's drawing showed a Réunion parakeet.

In 2020, Jansen and Cheke pointed out that Marinet's plate that serves as the type illustration of P. eques differs considerably in colouration between copies (some have yellow on the upper breast while others do not, for example). They concluded that these were hand-coloured by different people after an unidentified master plate by Martinet, but since it cannot be established which of the copies that accurately represents the specimen they depicted, Jansen and Cheke found it safer to rely on the description by Brisson. In 2021, Jansen and Cheke found that the variation in plumage seen in males in Mauritius is wide enough to encompass that known from the descriptions, illustrations and skin from Réunion. They therefore concluded that the two populations belonged to a single species with no subspecies. They also found that there was no evidence to reliably confirm what island the Edinburgh skin was collected from, and that since it was unknown to the French encyclopaedists that echo parakeets also lived on Mauritius, birds matching their descriptions were assigned to Réunion by default.

A 2022 genetic study by the Brazilian ornithologist Alexandre P. Selvatti and colleagues confirmed the earlier studies in regard to the relationship between Psittacula, the Mascarene parrot, and Tanygnathus. They suggested that Psittaculinae originated in the Australo–Pacific region (then part of the supercontinent Gondwana), and that the ancestral population of the Psittacula–Mascarinus lineage were the first psittaculines in Africa by the late Miocene (8–5 million years ago), and colonised the Mascarenes from there.

== Description ==
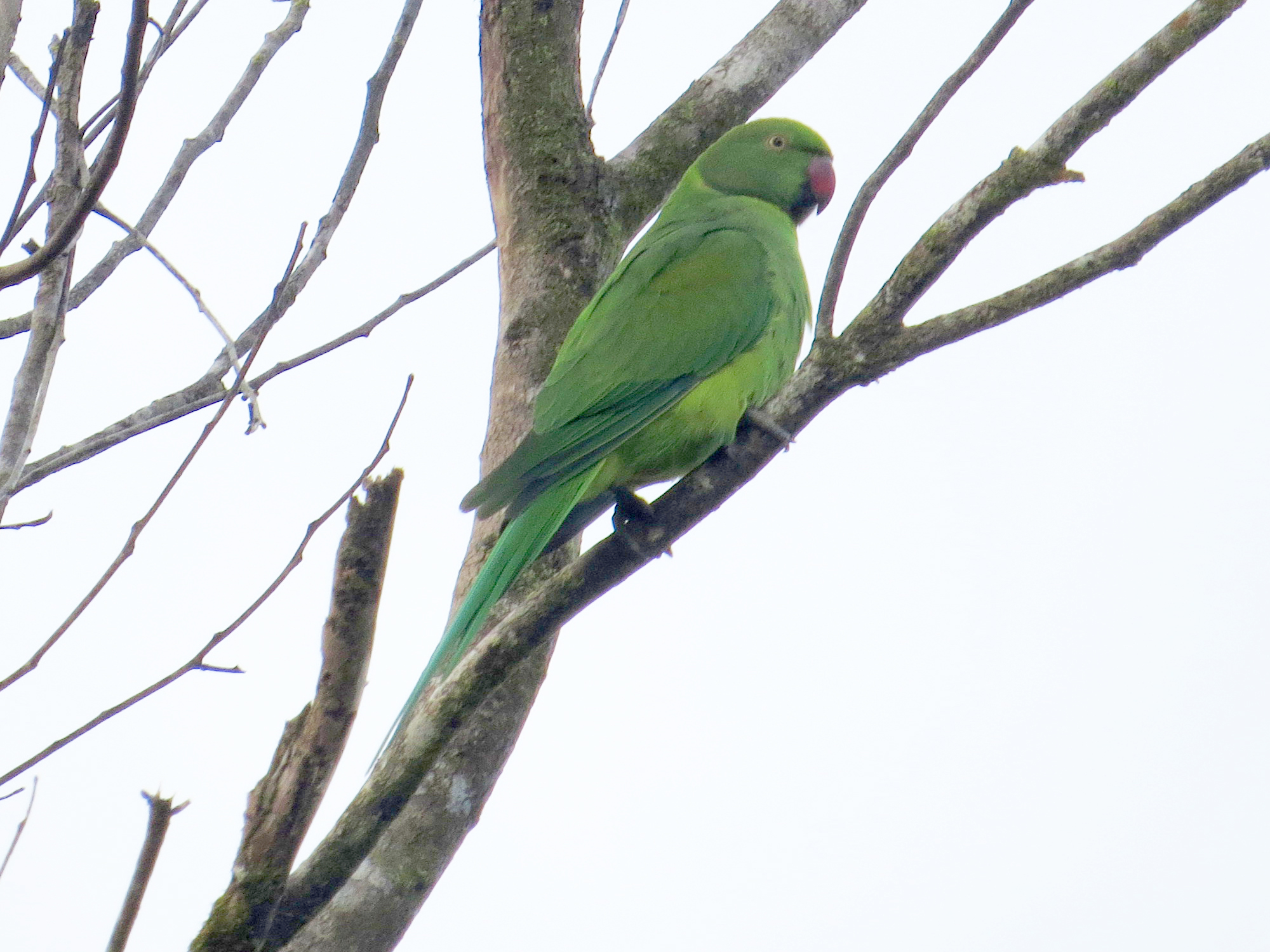
Female: note light green collar

The echo parakeet is 34–42 cm (13–17 in) long and weighs 167–193 g (5.9–6.8 oz), which makes it smaller than the other, now extinct, Mauritian parrots. The wingspan is 49–54 cm (19–21 in), each wing is 177–190 mm (7.0–7.5 in) long, the tail is 164–200 mm (6.5–7.9 in), the culmen is 21–23 mm (0.83–0.91 in), and the tarsus is 20–22 mm (0.79–0.87 in). The female is somewhat smaller than the male on average. It is generally green, with a darker back and yellowish underside. The male is lighter and the female darker overall. It has two ring collars on the neck, which are incomplete, failing to meet at the back. The male has one black and one pink collar, which appears crescent shaped in side view, and has blue suffusion above it. The female has an indistinct black collar and a green collar, which becomes dark green across the cheeks and yellow-green at the back of the neck. The male has a black, narrow line running from the cere to the eye. The outer primary feathers of some males are tinged with blue. The upper bill of the adult male is bright red, the lower blackish brown, while the upper bill of the female is dark, almost black. The iris is yellow, varying from pale to greenish, but individuals with pink or white irides have also been noted. The skin around the eyes is orange, and the feet are grey, varying from greenish to blackish. The bill of the juvenile is red-orange, similar to that of the adult male, until two to three months after it fledges, when it changes to black, similar to that of the adult female. The immature is similar to the female.

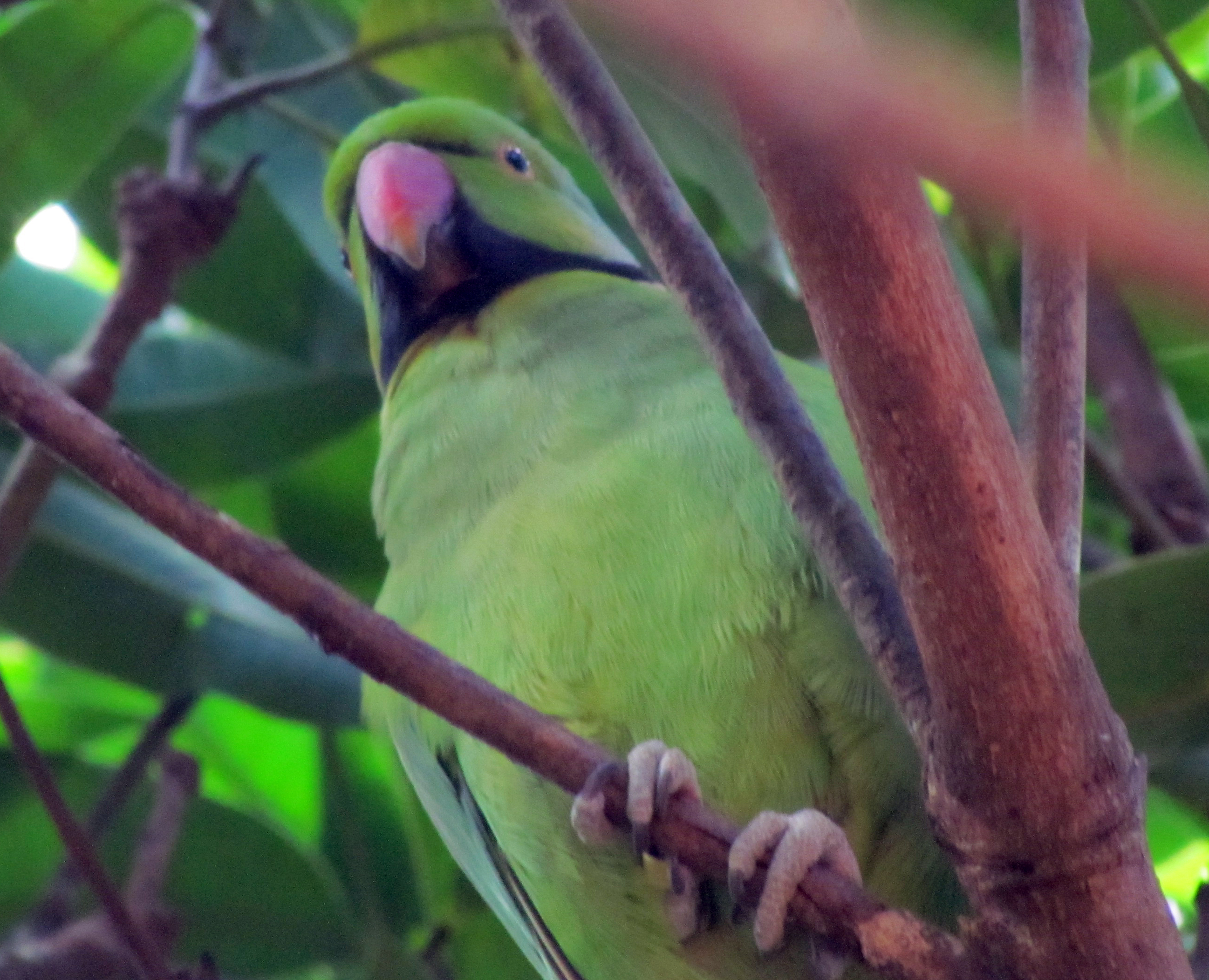
Male: note black collar, line from cere to eye, and red upper bill

Based on the single known specimen and contemporary accounts, it is believed the male of the extinct Réunion subspecies was generally similar to that of Mauritius, but differed in being slightly larger, each wing being 193 mm (7.6 in) long and the culmen 24.5 mm (0.96 in). The pink collar entirely encircled its neck, whereas it tapers out and leaves a gap at the back of the neck in the Mauritius subspecies. The Réunion subspecies also appears to have had darker lower parts. The echo parakeet is very similar to the related rose-ringed parakeet (which has been introduced to Mauritius, making confusion possible), though the green plumage of the former is darker and richer, its nape has a bluish wash, and its tail is greener above, and shorter. The female is similar to that of the rose-ringed parakeet though darker, and more emerald green. Unlike the echo parakeet, the rose-ringed parakeet does not display sexual dimorphism in beak colour. The echo parakeet is also stockier, and about 25% larger in body size and weight than the rose-ringed parakeet. The echo parakeet has comparatively shorter, broader, and more rounded wings than other Psittacula species, as well as a shorter and broader tail.

=== Vocalisations ===
The echo parakeet has a wide range of vocalisations, and are most vocal before roosting in the evening. They vocalise all year, but more during the breeding season. The most common vocalisation is the contact call, a low, nasal squawk sounding like "chaa-chaa, chaa-chaa" (also transliterated as "chaa-choa" or "kaah"), which is emitted singly or in a fast series, about twice a second. The flight call is very similar to the contact call. There is a higher pitched excitement or alarm call which sounds like "chee-chee-chee-chee" three or four times a second, usually emitted during flight with shallow, rapid wing beats. When disturbed or frightened, it may give a short, sharp "ark" call. It emits more melodious chirrups and whistles while perched. A deep, quiet "werr-werr" and a "prr-rr-rr" purr has also been heard on two occasions from a female landing in a tree. A courtship call can be heard between September and December. They also "growl" when angry, in a similar way to other parrots. The voice of the echo parakeet is very different from that of the rose-ringed parakeet, which has higher, faster, and more "excited" sounding vocalisations, and their calls cannot be confused.

== Habitat and distribution ==
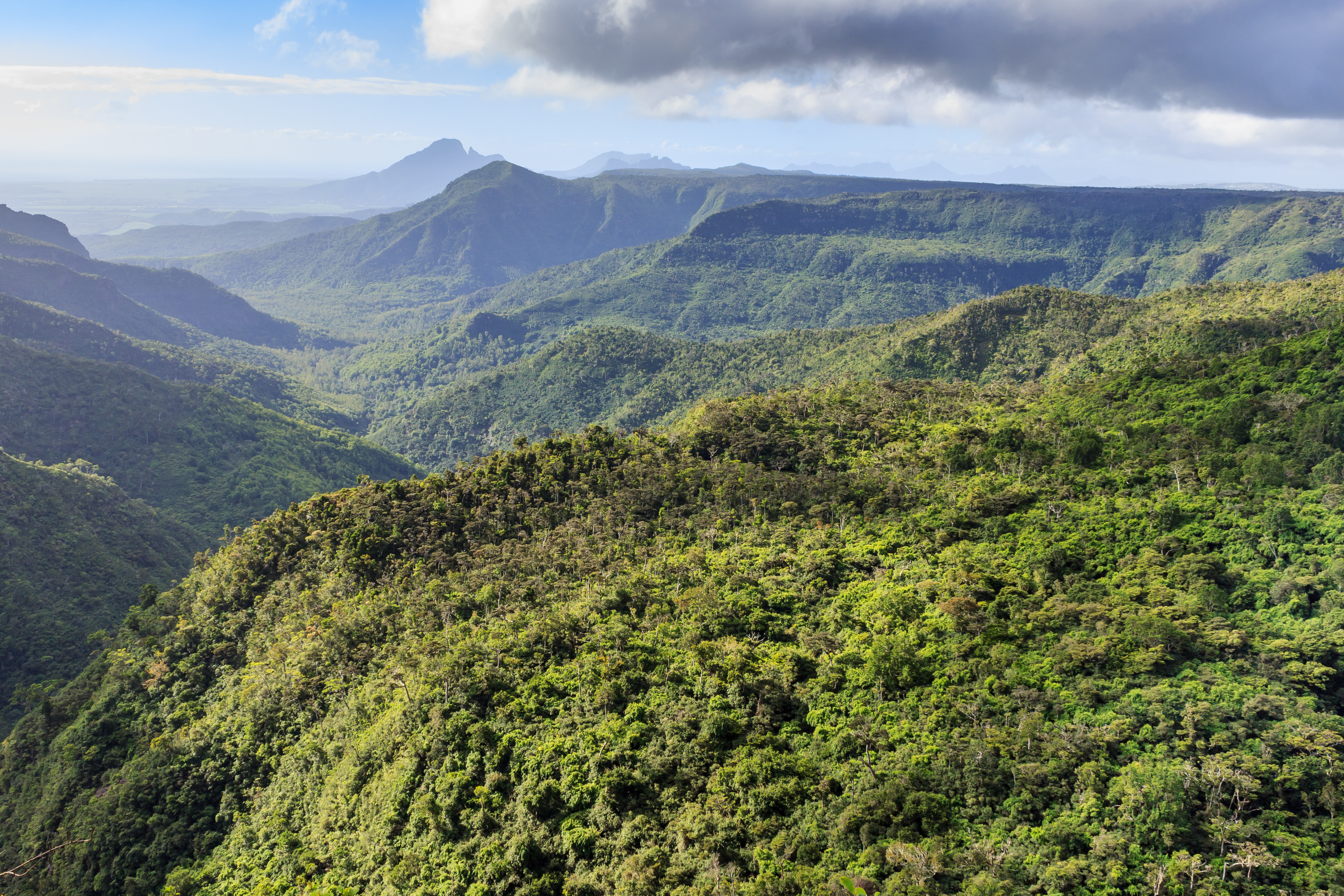
Black River Gorges National Park, where this species is mainly found

The echo parakeet is now restricted to forested areas of Mauritius with native vegetation, which covers less than 2% of Mauritius as of 2017, namely the Black River Gorges National Park in the southwest. They occupy only about 40 square kilometres (15 sq mi), and use about half of this area regularly. Within the park, there are four northern populations (in the Black River Gorges) and two southern (in Bel Ombre forest). In the upland forest, they prefer large, mature trees such as Canarium paniculatum, Syzygium contractum, Mimusops maxima, Labourdonnaisia sp. Other important feeding areas include lowland, intermediate and scrub forests. There are annual fluctuations in how often echo parakeets are seen in their habitats, which reflect population density. While the distribution of the species is tied to native forests, its numbers and distribution decreasing as these are destroyed, several early accounts indicate its distribution was always thin. The echo parakeet also formerly occurred in heavily degraded areas, which were therefore only lightly wooded. Though now sedentary, the parakeet may have moved between areas seasonally in search for food; if cyclones had stripped trees of fruits, for example.

A 2012 genetic study by the British zoologist Claire Raisin and colleagues showed that before the programme of captive breeding, echo parakeets from the more isolated Bel Ombre regions in the southern part of Black River Gorges National Park were genetically different from the rest of the population, but that the genetic diversity was dispersed across the bird's range after the period of intense managing, when birds were moved between areas. The genetic differentiation between the populations may originally have been due to forest clearing, which isolated them from each other.

== Behaviour and ecology ==
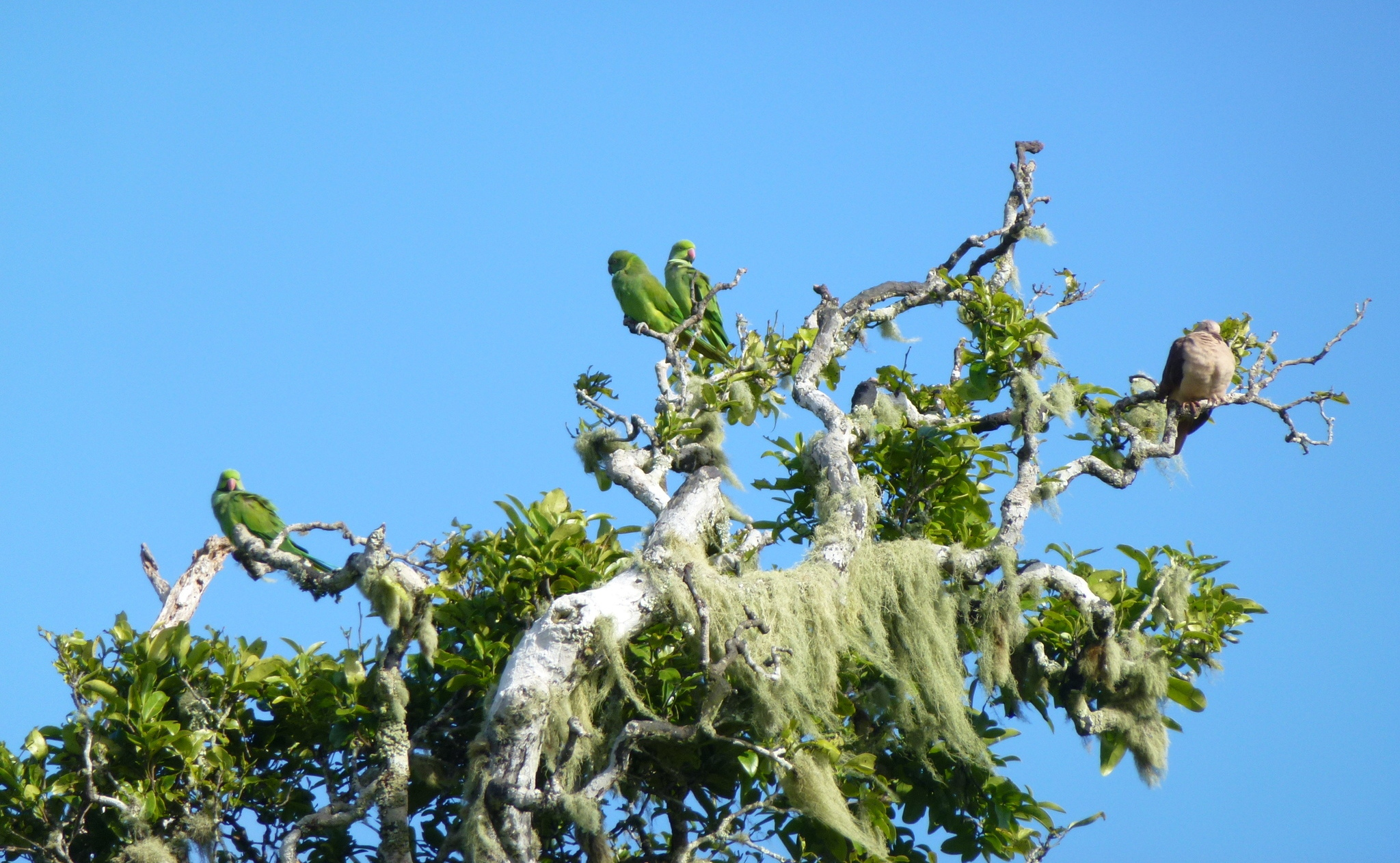
Group roosting in a tree, with a pink pigeon on the right

The echo parakeet is arboreal (tree dwelling) and keeps to the canopy of the forest when it feeds and rests. It usually moves around alone or in small groups and is less gregarious than the rose-ringed parakeet. When flying, the echo parakeet is good at exploiting updraughts while traversing ridges and flying over cliffs. It flies more slowly than the rose-ringed parakeet and has slower wing beats. It is adept at flying, though only for short distances, and is able to manoeuvre rapidly between the openings of the canopy. Like other Mauritian birds, echo parakeets are tame, more so during winter when food is scarce; they become more wary during the summer, when food is more readily available, and it becomes more difficult for humans to approach the birds. Breeding birds in nests are not disturbed by nearby cars and are not alarmed when their nests are examined. Echo parakeets mostly moult their feathers during summer, with variation in timing between individual birds and years. The body starts moulting in late winter, continuing for months, and the primary moult starts between November and January, well before the tail moults in March or April. Most of the echo parakeets have fully moulted by the end of June. The longevity of the species is unknown, but it can reach at least eight years.

The activity patterns of the echo parakeet are similar to those of other Psittacula parakeets in most respects. They mainly forage during mid-morning and mid- and late afternoon, and bad weather does not disrupt this activity. Groups rest and preen on large trees during the middle of the day (and occasionally at other times); these trees are usually not used for roosting. They are most active and vocal during the afternoon when they travel to and from feeding areas. They are very excitable during the hour before dusk (the time they roost), when they fly around in groups calling frequently, and briefly perch in treetops, before circling around again. They usually roost in sheltered areas on hillsides and ravines, preferring trees with dense foliage (such as Eugenia, Erythroxylum, or Labourdonnaisia), where they perch close to the trunks or in cavities. The number of birds recorded in individual roosting sites ranges from one to eleven. The birds usually leave a roosting site quietly in the morning, though some have been observed staying for several more hours.

=== Breeding ===
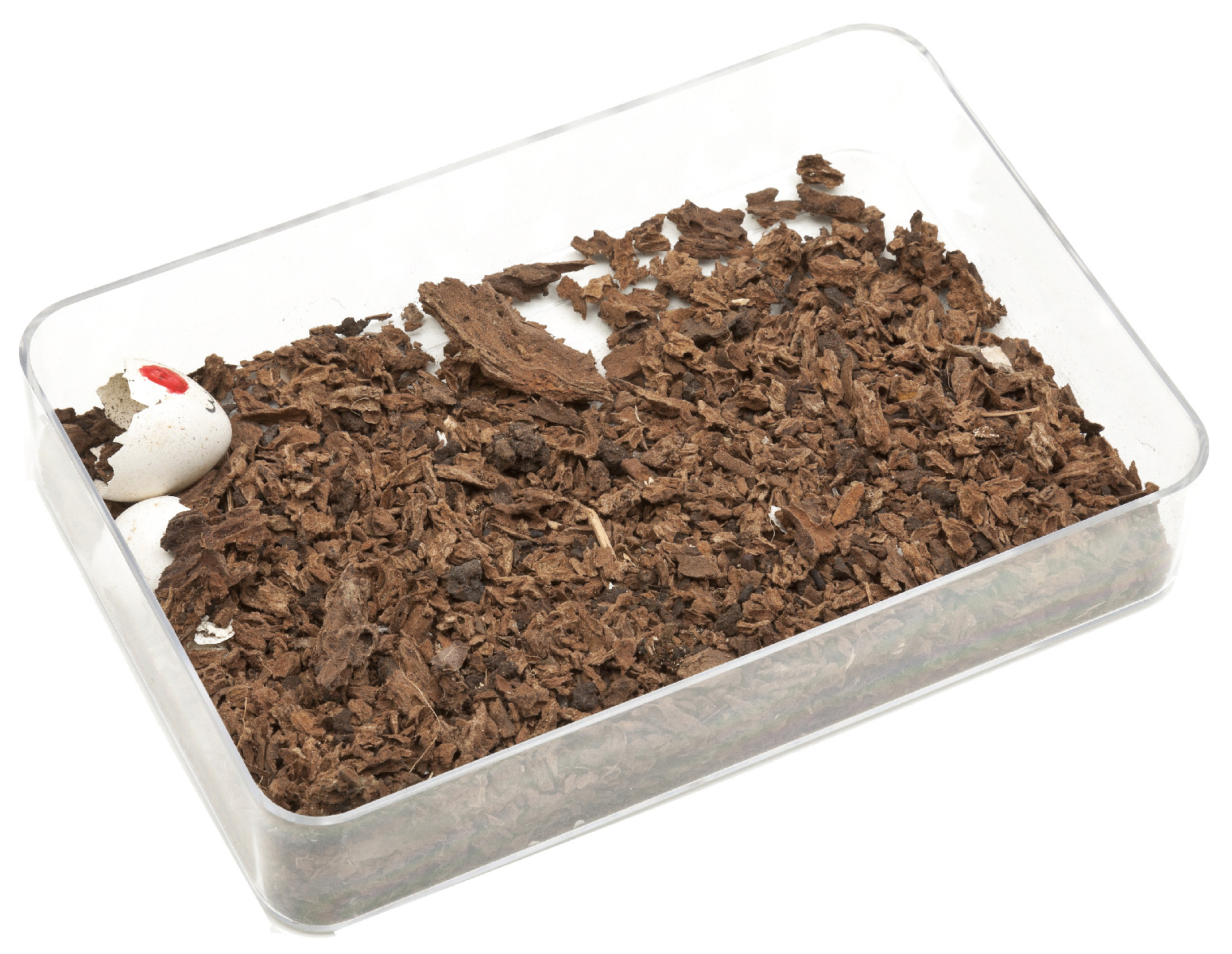
Nest contents, including shells of a hatched egg (left)

The breeding behaviour of the echo parakeet is similar to that of other Psittacula parakeets, most of which can breed by the time they are two years old. As in their relatives, the neck and head patterns of the echo parakeet are displayed during courtship and are therefore sexually selected, with variation and intensity of the colours probably signifying fitness. The pink collars are raised (and made more conspicuous) during displays of dominance, while the iris is dilated and contracted. The breeding season usually begins in August or September, and nest-election occurs early during the season. The birds nest in natural cavities, often in large, old native trees, such as Calophyllum, Canarium, Mimusops, and Sideroxylon, at least 10 m (33 ft) above the ground, and not exposed to the south east, which is affected by trade winds. The cavities are usually in horizontal branches (rather than vertical trunks), are at least 50 cm (20 in) deep, 20 cm (8 in) wide, and their entrance holes are 10–15 cm (4–6 in) in diameter. Flooding often occurs, and some holes have overhangs or other features that prevent or minimise it.

Pair maintenance behaviour is demonstrated throughout the year, the male usually being assertive, and includes regurgitatory feeding, billing, and the male preening the feathers of the female's nape. Copulation has been observed in September and October, and the sequence that leads up to it is similar to that of the rose-ringed and Alexandrine parakeets. The male wipes his beak before approaching the female, walks slowly towards her, and preens her nape. The female squats horizontally, and is then mounted by the male, who repeatedly raises and drops his head during copulation. The mounting may last up to five minutes, whereafter the male may feed the female and the pair preen each other.

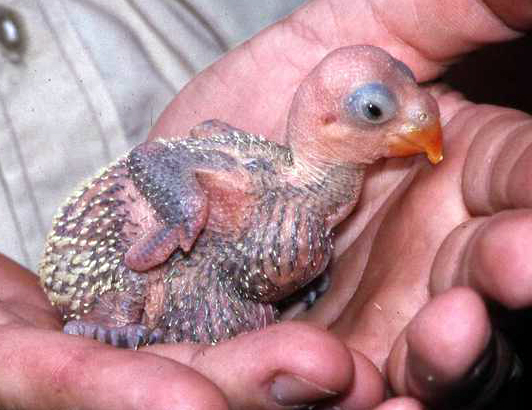
Hand-reared chick

Eggs are laid between August and October, mostly in late September and early October, and late clutches may be due to repeated laying. Clutch size has been reported as normally two to four. The eggs are typical of parrots, rounded and white, measuring around 32.2 by 26.8 mm (1.27 by 1.06 in), and weighing about 11.4 g (0.40 oz). Incubation takes about 21–25 days and is done entirely by the female, as in related species. During this time, the female is fed four or five times a day by the male, approximately once every two hours, outside the nest hole. The young are brooded by the female, and are left unattended most of the day from two weeks after hatching. Nestlings about two weeks old were observed being fed by a parent with intervals of up to 79 minutes. It is unclear if one or both parents feed the young, but, as in other parrots, the female probably stays with them for the first few days while fed by the male, and when the young are homeothermic (have a stable body temperature), both take care of and feed the nestlings.

Two of the young are normally raised. Chicks develop slowly, with dark feather tracts visible on the back and primary quills after five days. The tracts are more visible after ten days when down tips breakthrough, their eyes are slit-like as they begin to open, and the legs turn from pinkish to pale grey. The eyes are almost fully open after fifteen days, and the chicks have a fine covering of greenish-grey down on most of the body, the secondary quills emerge, and feather tracts appear on the crown of the head. They are completely covered by greenish down after twenty days, and after thirty days the wing and tail feathers emerge. After forty days, all contour, wing, and tail feathers are well developed, but down is still retained on the lower parts and flanks. When nestlings are developed enough, they can threaten nest intruders with loud growls and bites but will retreat into nooks and stay still if the intruder persists. After fifty days, the chicks are rather active, flapping their wings and venturing near the entrance hole. Chicks fledge after 50–60 days, between late October and February, and fledglings remain near the nest entrance sometime after leaving. They accompany their parents to forage as soon as they can fly, and remain with them and are fed for two to three months after leaving the nest. The young have been observed imitating adults which were carefully selecting fruits, and have been observed being fed by adults as late as March.

Additional adult male echo parakeets acting as "helpers" by feeding the nesting female and the nestlings (usually rebuffed by the nesting pair, but sometimes disrupting nesting by making the pair leave their nest) were speculated to be correlated with a skewed sex ratio in the 1980s. The "helpers" were thought to be perhaps a recent phenomenon, possibly due to the destruction of foraging areas, and many non-breeding birds consequently being displaced to other areas, creating an unsustainable excess in the populations there. In the late 1990s, it was reported that the echo parakeet is perhaps not monogamous, but has a tendency for polyandry, where breeding groups consist of multiple males and a single female (though monogamous pairs were also observed). It was also shown that the sex ratio in the population is consistently biased towards males according to historical counts. A 2008 genetic study by the British biologists Tiawanna D. Taylor and David T. Parkin showed that the sex ratio was equal among echo parakeet chicks and embryos and that the male-biased sex ratio among adults is therefore not due to, for example, inbreeding. A preliminary 2009 genetic study by Taylor and Parkin showed that matings of "auxiliary males" with the female of a breeding pair do occur, and that the echo parakeet is therefore not strictly monogamous. Such a mating system is beneficial to the conservation of the species, as it increases genetic diversity, but it is unclear why such breeding groups form.

=== Diet and feeding ===
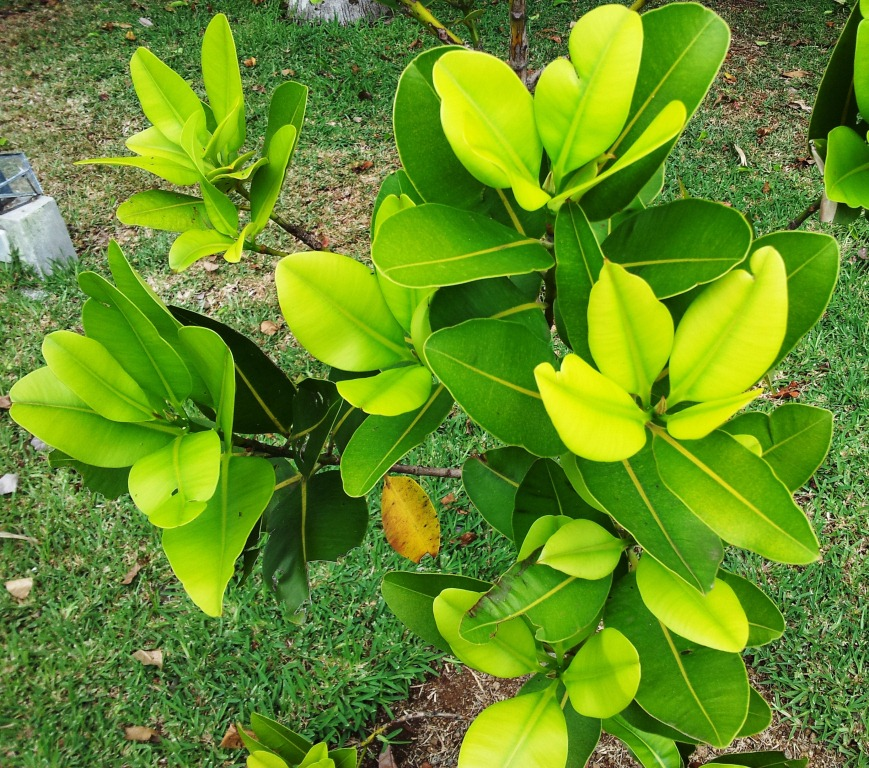
Calophyllum tacamahaca is part of the diet of this parakeet.

The echo parakeet mainly feeds on native Mauritian plants, though small amounts of introduced plants are also eaten, and eats parts such as fruits (53%), leaves (31%), flowers (12%), buds, young shoots, seeds, twigs, and bark or sap (4%). It feeds in the trees and rarely or never lands on the ground, and returns to favoured trees, which have been used for generations in some cases. According to one study, more than 25% of the plant species taken consisted of Calophyllum tacamahaca, Canarium paniculatum, Tabernaemontana mauritiana, Diospyros sp., Erythrospermum monticolum, Eugenia sp., Labourdonnaisia sp., Mimusops maxima, Mimusops petiolaris, Nuxia verticillata and Protium obtusifolium. Some species, such as Calophyllum parviflorum, are more important than others, while fruits of Syzygium contractum and Sideroxylon cinereum were often ignored.

Echo parakeets never forage on the ground, in contrast to the rose-ringed parakeet, and may have been pushed into an arboreal niche because other parrots of Mauritius were already adapted for ground feeding. Species that are now rare may have been favoured in the past, such as Olax psittacorum, known as bois perroquets (parakeet trees), perhaps because the birds were fond of it. Parakeets must have had an impact on seed production of favoured plants in the past; some fruits have a very hard epicarp (the tough outer skin) resistant to parrots, which may have evolved for protection. Some species have a hard epicarp surrounded by a fleshy pericarp which is eaten by echo parakeets, after which they reject the former, which probably contributes to seed dispersal. In 1987, it was reported that the fruits of the very common, introduced, Psidium cattleianum (commonly known as strawberry guava) were not taken by the echo parakeet, but in 1998, it was reported that the birds were increasingly utilising this and other exotic plants, including Averrhoa carambola (star fruit), Ligustrum robustum (privet), and Solanum auriculatum (wild apple).

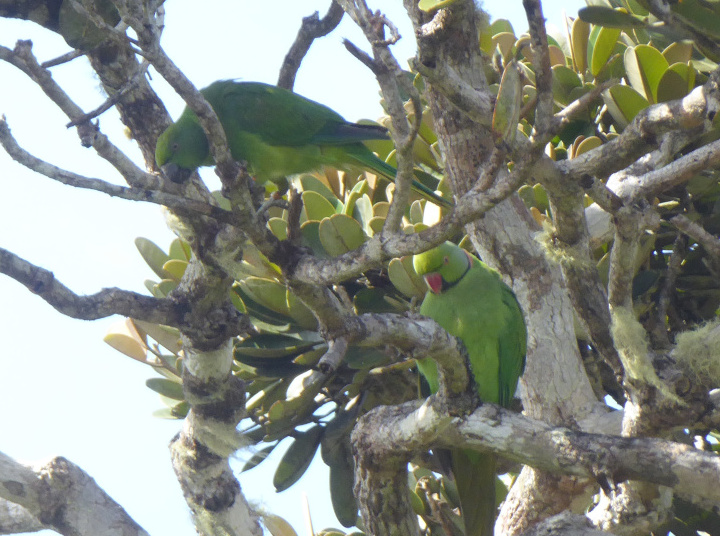
Female and male foraging in a tree

The echo parakeet forages in different areas in different seasons, and dwarf forest and scrubland are important throughout the year, the birds feeding on different species as edible parts become available. However, the fruiting of many plants is irregular and some species have become rare, and food is therefore not always seasonally available. When fruits are scarce during winter and early spring, the birds eat more leaves and spend more time foraging. The birds wander in search for food, sometimes several kilometres to and from an area. The echo parakeet forages alone or in small groups with individuals ignoring each other, but since so few birds used to exist, it has been hard to estimate how social the species is. Pairs stay loosely associated throughout the year and forage together. They mainly forage during the morning and late afternoon, feeding activity diminishing during harsh weather.

Echo parakeets are silent when they clamber around feeding. They remove fruits and flowers with their bills, sometimes hanging upside down to reach, the food is then held by a foot while eaten. When feeding on Tabernaemontana mauritiana leaves, the parakeets often scoop out the mesophyll (internal spongy tissue) while leaving the cellulose, whereafter the petiole and midrib are discarded. Many leaves and fruits are only partially eaten or sampled before being discarded. The parakeets may masticate a bite for several minutes before swallowing it.

=== Aggression and competition ===
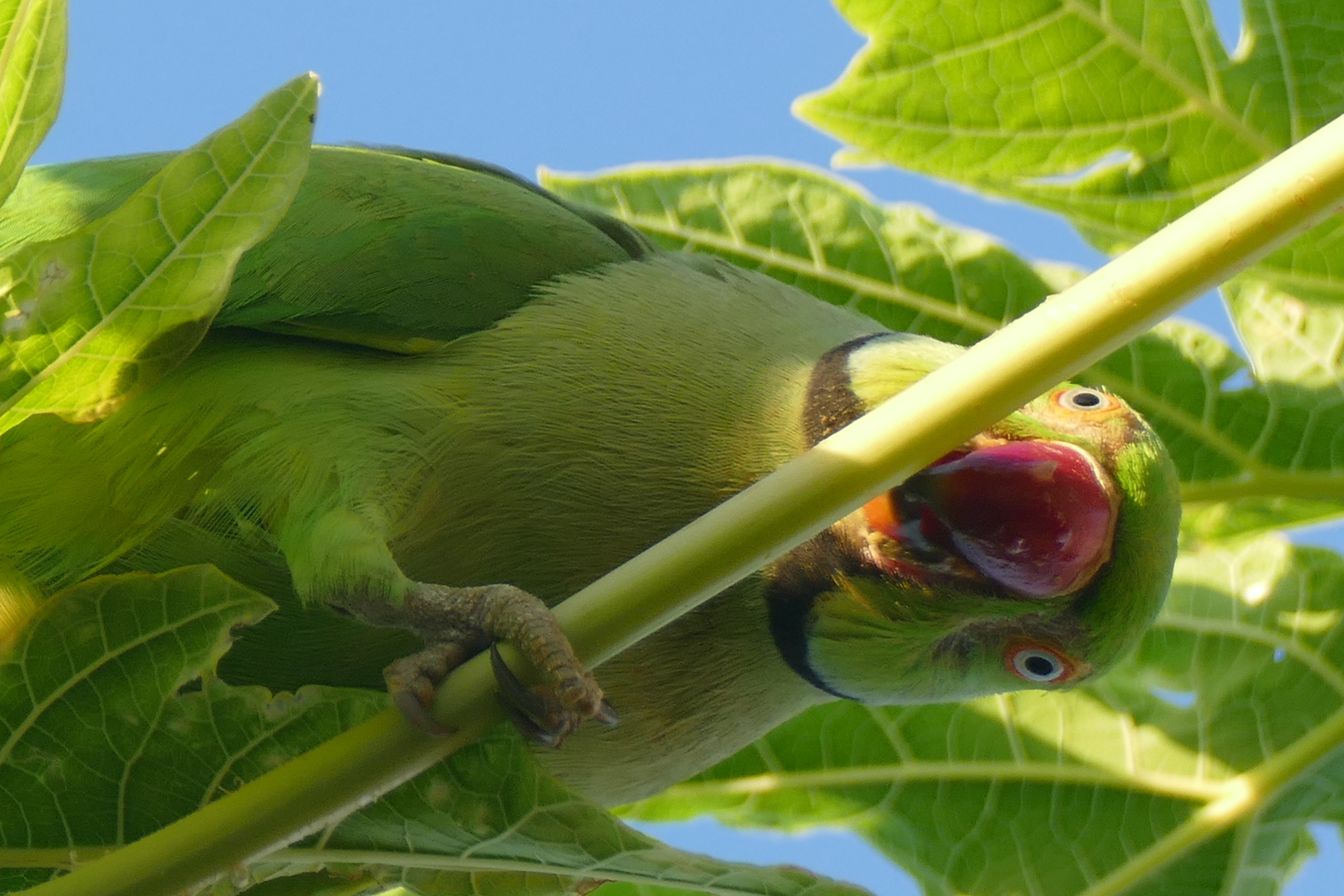
Rose-ringed parakeet on Mauritius: this related species was introduced around 1886, and competes for nest-sites and probably some food.

Psittacula parakeets employ mobbing behaviour with groups clustering together to noisily scold animals perceived as threatening. Echo parakeets may mob during territorial conflicts, or they may divert their flight to chase other birds. Echo parakeets have been observed chasing rose-ringed parakeets, Mauritius kestrels (Falco punctatus), white-tailed tropicbirds (Phaethon lepturus), and megabats. Mauritius kestrels are mobbed regularly by echo parakeets joining and flying around the kestrel together, and landing in surrounding trees while emitting alarm calls. They may also respond to introduced crab-eating macaques (Macaca fascicularis) with loud calls, though they have also been observed to ignore nearby foraging monkeys. They compete for food with the monkeys, and their diet overlaps with that of the pink pigeon (Nesoenas mayeri), the Mauritius bulbul (Hypsipetes olivaceus), and the Mauritian flying fox (Pteropus niger).

The echo parakeet is only territorial during the breeding season and defends the area around the nest tree. Their territoriality is inconsistent and not vigorous, and birds are in loose association with their breeding areas outside the season. They may direct their territorial aggression at both conspecifics and other species, many encounters being subtle and hard to recognise. Both sexes take part in defence before laying, but the male takes a dominant role afterwards. They first react by calling, which may be enough to discourage an intruder, but if the interaction becomes more intense, one or both members of the pair will approach the intruder by cautiously jumping between tree limbs, and will circle slowly around the trees near the nest, as the intruder gets closer. Fights are rare, although on one occasion two males were observed fighting in low bushes and then on the ground; one male broke free and flew away, and neither appeared to be seriously injured.

The rose-ringed parakeet (of the subspecies P. k. borealis) was introduced to Mauritius around 1886 and is now flourishing there. Its population is estimated at 10,000 birds and it is widespread across Mauritius. Closely related to the echo parakeet and physically similar, though no hybrids have been recorded, they compete for nest-sites and probably some food. The two species are usually passive towards each other outside the breeding season; they have been seen pursuing each other as well as flying together and feeding in the same trees. While the rose-ringed parakeet has much broader feeding requirements (and may be ecologically separated), it may have excluded the echo parakeet from expanding and adjusting its feeding ecology to the changing environment by entirely occupying this more generalised niche. The most serious form of competition between the echo parakeet and the rose-ringed parakeet is over nest-sites; the introduced species often takes over cavities used by the native parakeets. Echo parakeets are reportedly easily frustrated when defending their nest-territories and have been seen relinquishing them without physically defending them. Two out of seven echo parakeet nest cavities were taken over by rose-ringed parakeets in 1974, and only rose-ringed parakeets were nesting in the Macabé Ridge area for several years.

== Status ==
=== Decline ===
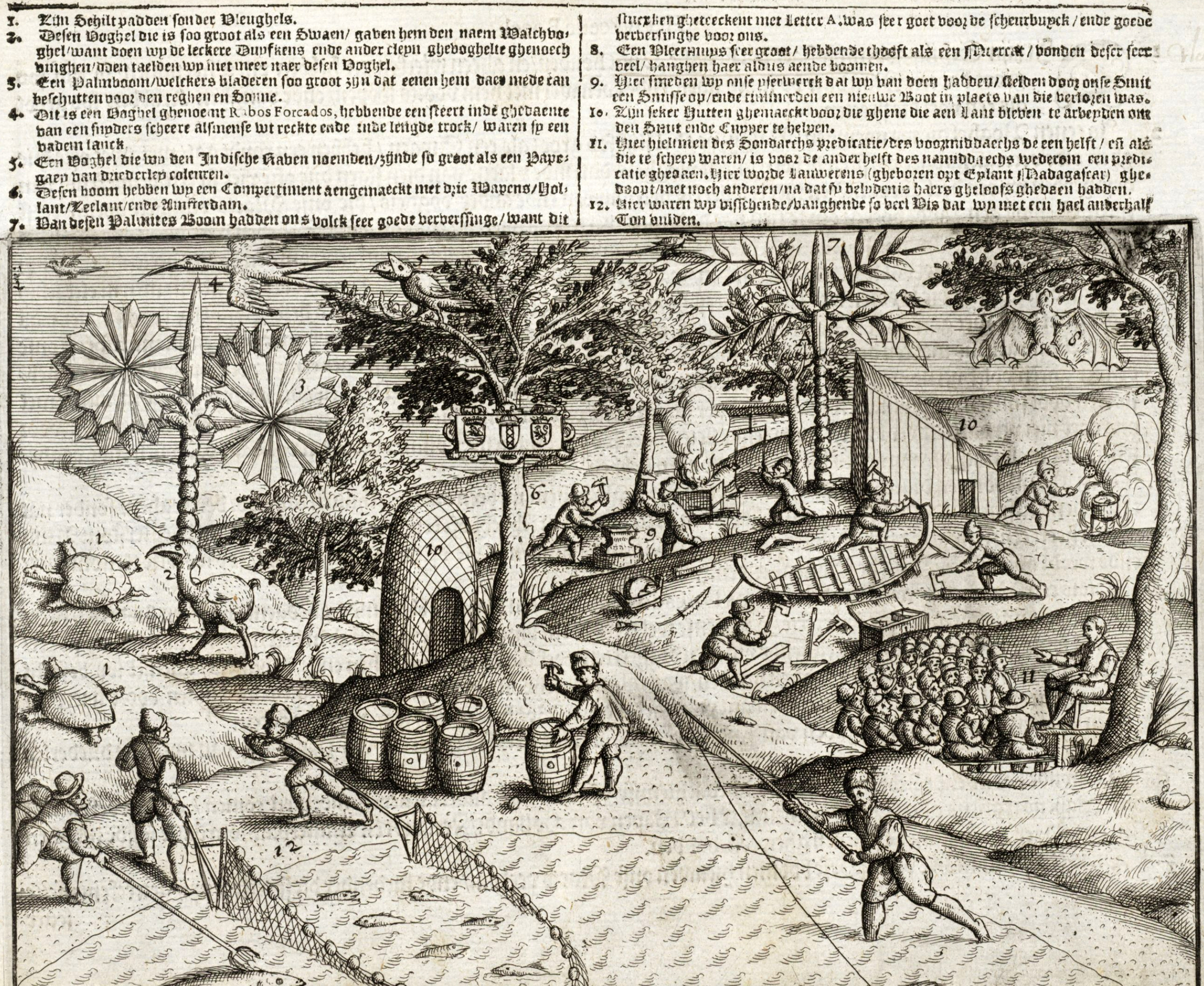
Depiction of Dutch activities on Mauritius in 1598, with various parrots above, and a dodo at the left

There are believed to have been seven endemic Mascarene parrot species; all but the echo parakeet have vanished. The others were likely made extinct by a combination of excessive hunting and deforestation by humans, as well as the invasive species brought with them (through predation and competition). On Mauritius, the echo parakeet coexisted with the broad-billed parrot (Lophopsittacus mauritianus) and the Mascarene grey parakeet (Psittacula bensoni), and the Réunion parakeet lived alongside the Mascarene parrot and the Mascarene grey parakeet. Newton's parakeet and the Rodrigues parrot (Necropsittacus rodricanus) lived on nearby Rodrigues. Worldwide, many parrots have been driven to extinction by humans; island populations have been especially vulnerable, partially due to their tameness. To the sailors who visited the Mascarene Islands from the late 16th-century onwards, the fauna was largely viewed as a source of food. Many other endemic species of Mauritius were lost after the arrival of humans to the island, including the dodo (Raphus cucullatus, which has since become a symbol of extinction), so the ecosystem of the island is severely damaged and hard to reconstruct. The surviving endemic fauna is still seriously threatened. Before humans arrived, Mauritius was entirely covered in forests, almost all of which have since been lost.

The last report of the Réunion parakeet is that of the French colonist Joseph-François Charpentier de Cossigny from 1732, and Hume expressed surprise that the population disappeared so quickly after the arrival of humans, considering the available habitat and the fact that the Mauritius population managed to survive. Hume estimated that the Réunion parakeet had gone extinct due to hunting and deforestation around 1730–50. Jones and colleagues pointed out that other Mascarene birds survived into the 18th and 19th centuries without being noted, and suggested that the Réunion parakeet could have survived as late as the early 19th century (Jossigny's sketch could support the parakeet surviving at least until c. 1770). Cossigny's final 1732 account of the Réunion parakeet (and the last of the Mascarene grey parakeet) reads as follows:

The woods are full of parrots, either completely grey or completely green. They were eaten a lot formerly, the grey especially, but both are always lean and very tough whatever sauce one puts on them.

The Dutch soldier Johannes Pretorius (on Mauritius from 1666 to 1669) reported that there were many parrots, and that echo parakeets were caught alive with nets, but could sometimes not be caught, being too high up in trees. Parrots were often caught to be given as gifts or sold during the 17th century and were probably kept alive on Mauritius before being exported. That the parrots kept to high trees indicates they had become wary of humans at this time. In 1754 and 1756, D. de La Motte described the abundance of echo parakeets in Mauritius, and their use as food:

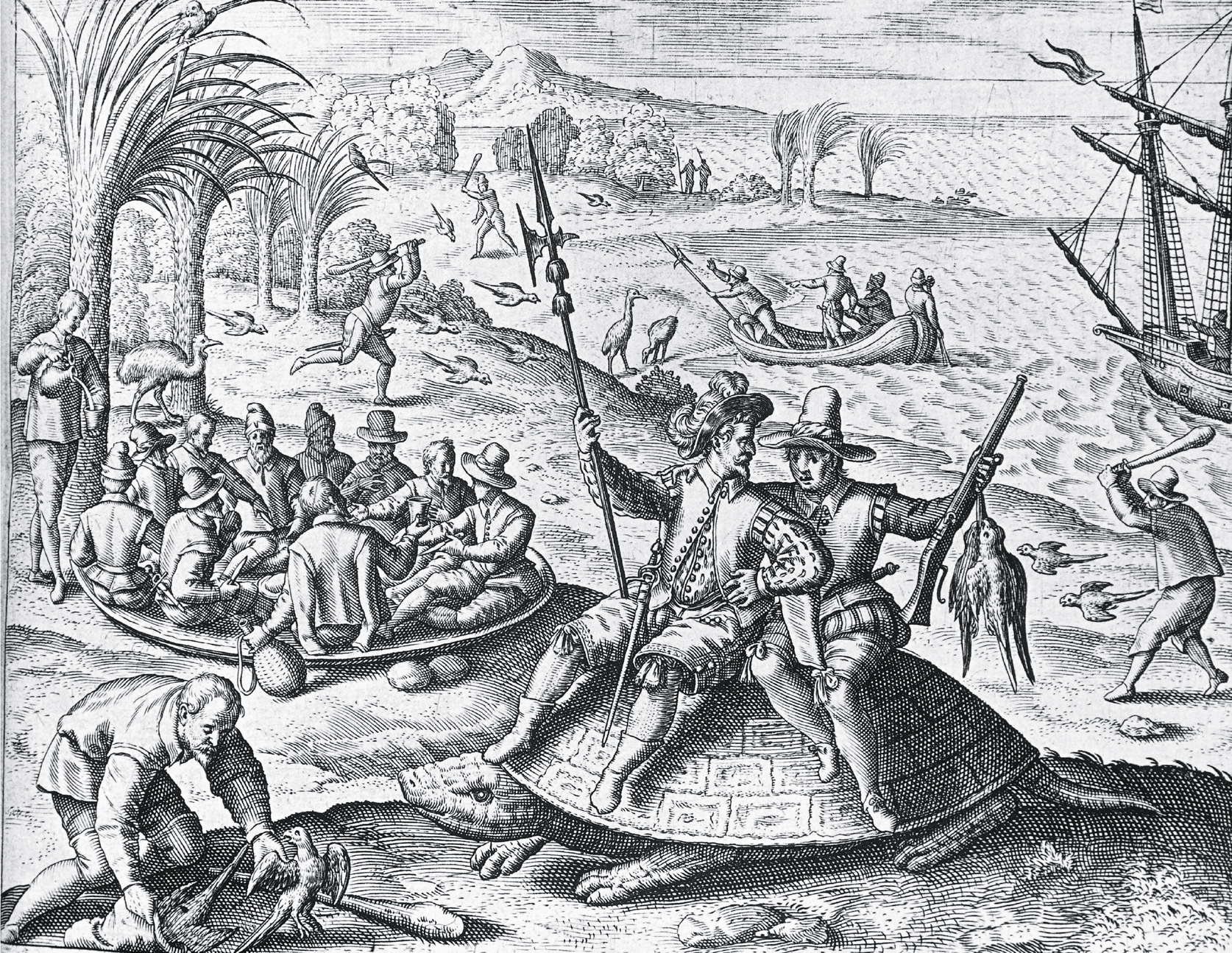
Depiction of the Dutch hunting parrots on Mauritius in 1598

One eats here [in Mauritius] a good number of long-tailed green parrots called perruches whose flesh is black and very good. A hunter can kill three or four dozen in a day. There is a time of year when these birds eat a seed that makes their flesh bitter and even dangerous.

Assessments of the echo parakeet's status varied in early literature; while it was said to be "quite common" in the 1830s, by 1876 the Newtons said "its numbers are gradually falling". In 1904, the French naturalist Paul Carié said the population was "reasonably large", while Rothschild said the bird was rare and apparently "on the verge of extinction" in 1907. Areas where the echo parakeet could be found were cleared for tea and forestry from the 1950s to the 1970s, and the birds were forced into the remaining native habitat, in and around the Black River Gorges. 50 pairs were estimated to be left in 1970, though this may have been too high. By 1975, it was estimated that about 50 individuals remained, but the population appears to have dropped noticeably in the following years, and by 1983 only a flock of 11 birds was seen, which was believed to represent the entire population. The drop in numbers around this time may have been tied to cyclone Claudette in December 1979. There was little nesting success, and the parakeets reproduced at a level below that necessary for replacement.

=== Conservation ===
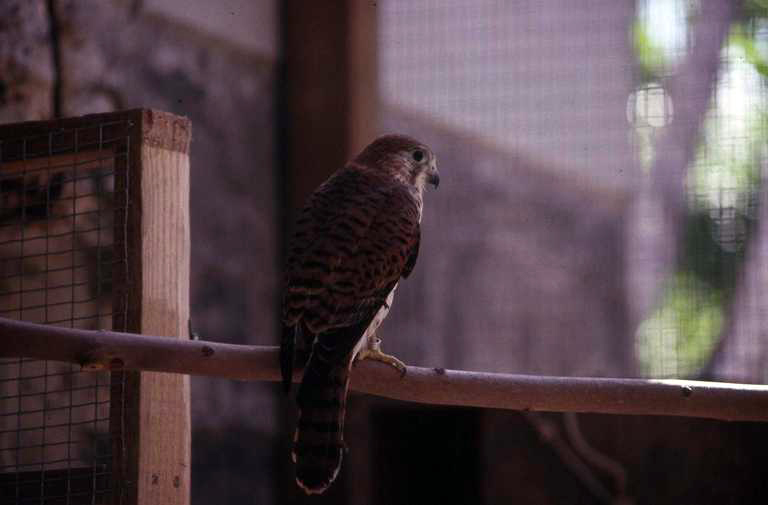
Mauritius kestrel awaiting release in 1989; this species was considered the rarest bird in the world by 1973 but was saved through captive breeding, an approach later successfully applied to the echo parakeet.

The plight of the endangered Mauritian birds attracted the attention of ornithologists beginning in the early 1970s, who went to the island to study them. The Mauritius kestrel was by 1973 considered the rarest bird in the world, with only six individuals left, and the pink pigeon numbered about 20 birds in the wild; both species were later saved from extinction through captive breeding by the Jersey Wildlife Preservation Trust (now known as Durrell Wildlife Conservation Trust). The American biologist Stanley Temple began a programme to halt the decline of the echo parakeet in 1974, but these attempts failed, since unlike other Psittacula parakeets, it proved difficult to keep them in captivity (all the birds involved died). Capturing more birds also failed, none of the nest boxes placed by Temple were used by the parakeets, and translocating the few remaining birds elsewhere was deemed too risky. By the 1980s, most Mauritian naturalists believed the echo parakeet was going to be extinct in the near future; it was now considered the rarest and most endangered Mascarene bird, and was referred to as "the world's rarest parrot".

In 1980, Carl Jones described the situation as desperate, and stated that the remaining birds would have to be caught for captive breeding if the echo parakeet was to be saved; this solution was also recommended by the International Council for Bird Preservation the same year. By the 1980s, only 8–12 echo parakeets were known, including three females, and Jones, who had led the efforts that saved the Mauritius kestrel and the pink pigeon, turned his focus on the parakeets. The New Zealand conservationist Don Merton (who had faced similar problems with birds in his homeland) was invited to help, and drawing on their experience with other birds, they devised a strategy for the echo parakeet. They treated nests with insecticides to prevent chicks being killed by nest flies, secured nest entrances to prevent tropic-birds from taking over them, stapled smooth PVC around trunks and placed poison nearby to deter black rats, and pruned canopies around nest trees to prevent monkeys attacking by jumping there from nearby trees. Feeding hoppers were introduced to provide food during seasonal shortages, though it took years for the birds to learn how to use them, and nest cavities were made waterproof. Following improved breeding success in the wild, there were 16–22 birds in 1993/4, and another captive pair produced a chick in 1993. Due to the successes with saving native birds, the Black River Gorges and surrounding areas were declared the first national park of Mauritius in 1994.

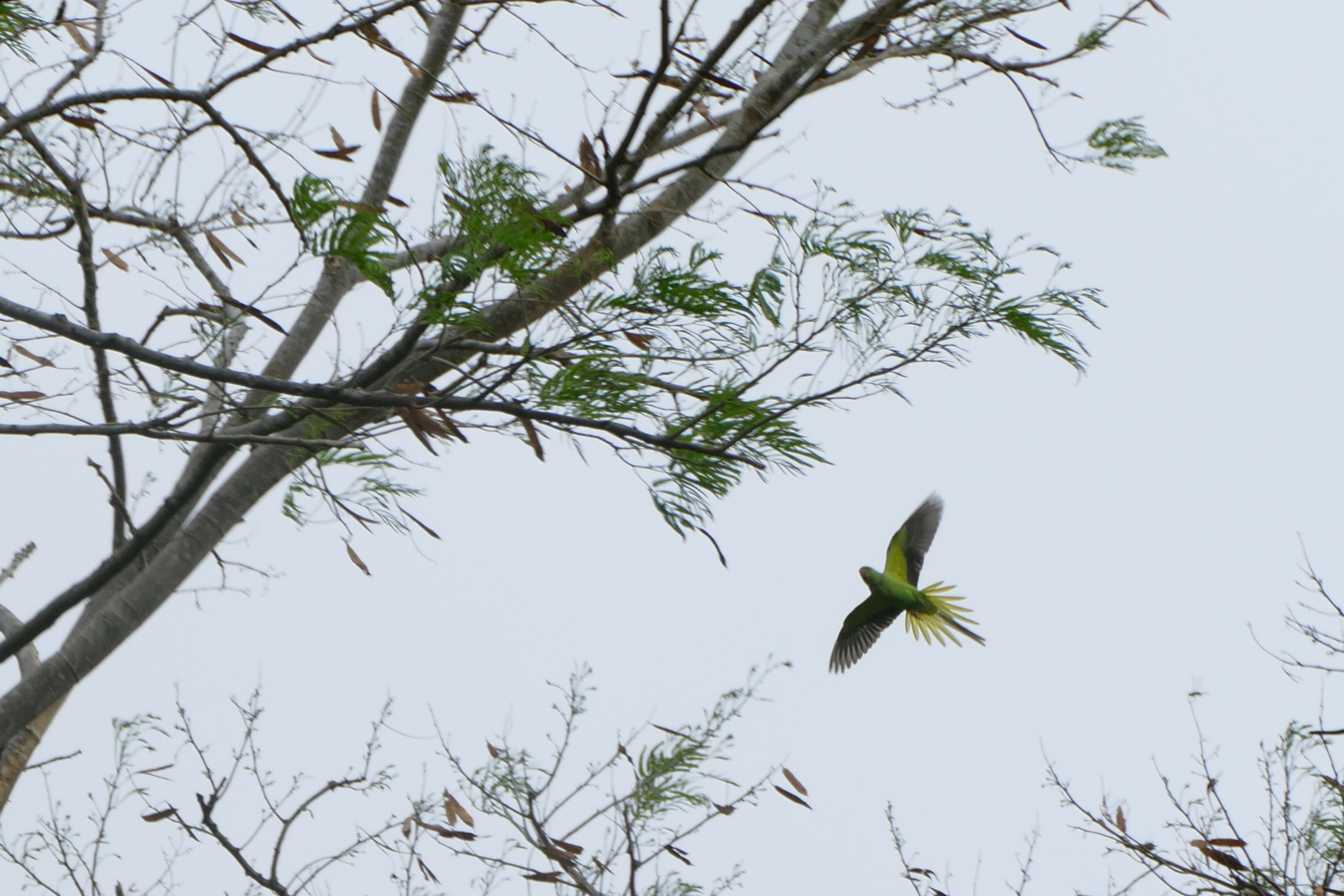
Echo parakeet in flight at Sir Seewoosagur Ramgoolam Botanical Garden

In 1996, six previously unknown echo parakeet breeding groups were found in the Black River Gorges, some in areas of the Bel Ombre forest that had not been surveyed before and others within the known breeding range. These almost doubled the number of breeding groups from those seen the previous season. The echo parakeet was made a priority project by the Mauritian Wildlife Foundation following the season's breeding success, and it was decided to initiate a captive breeding programme at the Gerald Durrell Endemic Wildlife Sanctuary. It was discovered that from clutches of three or four eggs, only one chick would usually fledge, so the team began to take the surplus; the parents could more easily raise the brood they were left with, and such surplus chicks would be given to pairs that had failed to hatch their eggs. Many surplus chicks were also taken to the breeding centre where they were reared successfully, and the first three birds bred in captivity were released into the wild in 1997. These and later hand-reared birds were found to be too tame and naive; they would land on people's shoulders, or near cats and mongooses, which subsequently killed them. Jones decided to release the captive-bred birds after nine to ten weeks when fledging would normally occur, instead of seventeen, and these young birds were better at integrating with wild birds, and learning social and survival skills. Captive-bred birds who had learned to use feeding hoppers in captivity passed on this ability to wild birds, and the number of birds that fed at food hoppers and used nest boxes provided by the team increased in the following years. The birds had not used the nest boxes before 2001, after which they were improved in design. By 1998, there were 59–73 birds, including 14 that had been captive bred since 1997.

By 2005, 139 captive birds had been released and intensive management of the wild population ceased in 2006. Since then only supplemental food and nest boxes have been provided. By 2007, about 320 echo parakeets lived in the wild, with numbers growing, and the species was downgraded from critically endangered to endangered on the 2007 IUCN Red List of Threatened Species; its numbers were still low overall and its range restricted. In 2009–2010, 78% of nesting attempts occurred in nesting boxes and a record of 134 chicks fledged during this breeding season. By 2016 the population had approached 700 birds. Though the echo parakeet is considered to have been saved from extinction, it still needs continued management by humans to stay secure from remaining threats. Since the carrying capacity of the Black River Gorges National Park had reached its limit, echo parakeets were released in the mountains of eastern Mauritius around 2016, and it has been suggested that birds could be introduced to the other Mascarene Islands. In 2015, Jackson and colleagues suggested that, due to their close genetic relatedness, the echo parakeet could be used as ecological replacements of the extinct Réunion parakeet and Newton's parakeet of Rodrigues, which would also secure the echo parakeet further. Since it has been suggested that some endemic trees and parrots on the Mascarenes co-evolved, reintroducing the echo parakeet could aid in seed-dispersal, a function previously carried out by its extinct relatives. Jackson and colleagues cautioned that the rose-ringed parakeet is seen as a crop-pest on Rodrigues and that local communities may, therefore, be apprehensive towards the introduction of the very similar echo parakeet, which may act the same way in a new environment. By 2019, the population had reached 750 birds in the wild, and the species' conservation status was classified as vulnerable.

=== Threats ===
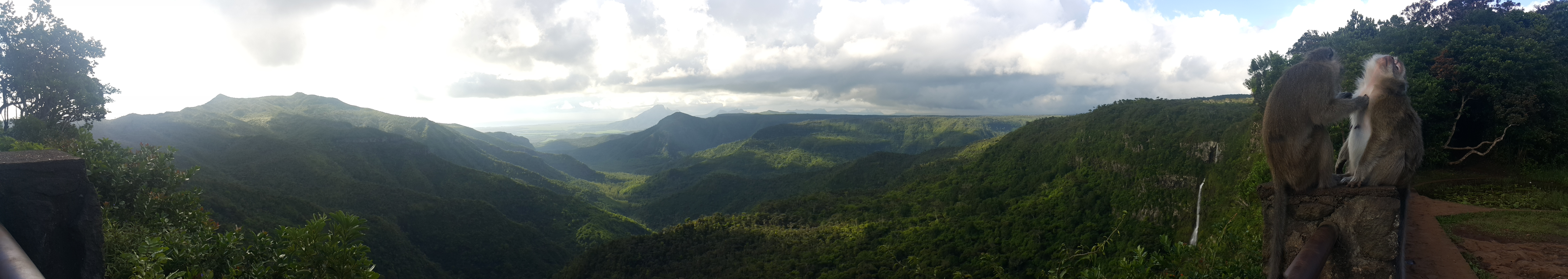
View of Black River Gorges National Park, with crab-eating macaques on the right; these introduced monkeys compete for food with, and sometimes kill echo parakeets.

The main threat to the species is destruction and alteration of its native habitat, resulting in the loss of feeding areas, which would force the birds to travel widely to find food. In times of food shortage, the female may not receive adequate amounts of food from the male and would be forced to leave the nest to forage, sometimes abandoning it completely. Parakeets have difficulties finding new nest sites if their nests are destroyed or taken by competitors, and many of the old trees used for nesting sites have been destroyed by cyclones; cyclones also kill birds and remove the fruit from trees. Competitors for nest-cavities include bees and wasps, white-tailed tropic-birds, rose-ringed parakeets, common mynas (Acridotheres tristis), and rats. Rats and crab-eating macaques prey on parakeet eggs and chicks (even nesting parents have been killed by the latter), and the monkeys are also the most serious competitors for food since they strip fruits off trees before they are ripe. Chicks are threatened by the bloodsucking larvae of tropical nest flies (Passeromyia heterochaeta) as well, which are a major cause of mortality. African giant land-snails (Achatina spp.) can suffocate chicks with their slime while entering nests in search of food or shelter. Other introduced species such as feral pigs and rusa deer (Rusa timorensis) also disturb the parakeets. Hunting by humans does not appear to have been a threat to the species in recent times, and very few have been taken for the pet trade.

An isolated case of psittacine beak and feather disease was recorded in an echo parakeet in 1996; in 2004 there was a significant outbreak, and a subsequent screening programme showed that more than 30% of sampled birds had encountered the disease. Birds younger than two years old are most affected, and 40–50% of fledglings die from it and associated infections each year. Some birds recover, but it is not known if they remain carriers of the disease and pass it on to their offspring, or how it is spread. The disease is also found in local rose-ringed parakeets, but it is not known in which direction it was first transmitted. Though Temple speculated that the population crash in the 1970s was due to disease, no evidence supports this. No parasites were found in droppings examined in the 1970s.
