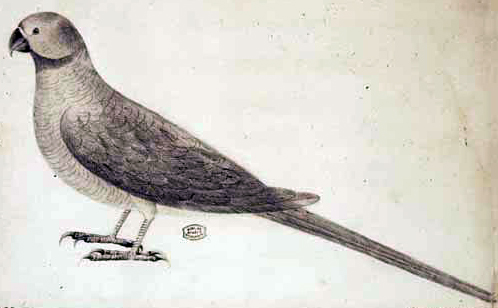
- Life drawing by Paul Jossigny, 1770s

Conservation status
- Extinct (ca. 1875) (IUCN 3.1)

Scientific classification
- Kingdom: Animalia
- Phylum: Chordata
- Class: Aves
- Order: Psittaciformes
- Family: Psittaculidae
- Genus: Psittacula
- Species: †P. exsul

Binomial name
- †Psittacula exsul (Newton, 1872)
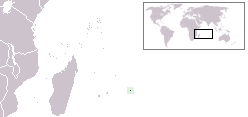
- Location of Rodrigues

Synonyms
- Palaeornis exsul Newton, 1872

= Newton's parakeet =

Extinct parrot from the island Rodrigues

Newton's parakeet (Psittacula exsul), also known as the Rodrigues parakeet or Rodrigues ring-necked parakeet, is an extinct species of parrot that was endemic to the Mascarene island of Rodrigues in the western Indian Ocean. Several of its features diverged from related species, indicating long-term isolation on Rodrigues and subsequent adaptation. The rose-ringed parakeet of the same genus is a close relative and probable ancestor. Newton's parakeet may itself have been ancestral to the endemic parakeets of nearby Mauritius and Réunion.

Around 40 centimetres (16 in) long, Newton's parakeet was roughly the size of a rose-ringed parakeet. Its plumage was mostly greyish or slate blue in colour, which is unusual in Psittacula, a genus containing mostly green species. The male had stronger colours than the female and possessed a reddish instead of black beak, but details of a mature male's appearance are uncertain; only one male specimen is known, and it is believed to be immature. Mature males might have possessed red patches on the wing like the related Alexandrine parakeet. Both sexes had a black collar running from the chin to the nape, but this was clearer in the male. The legs were grey and the iris yellow. Some 17th-century accounts indicate that some members of the species were green, which would suggest that both blue and green colour morphs occurred, but no definitive explanation exists for these reports. Little is known about its behaviour in life, but it may have fed on the nuts of the bois d'olive tree, along with leaves. It was very tame and was able to mimic speech.

Newton's parakeet was first written about by the French Huguenot François Leguat in 1708 and was only mentioned a few times by other writers afterwards. The specific name "exsul" is a reference to Leguat, who was exiled from France. Only two life drawings exist, both of a single specimen held in captivity in the 1770s. The species was scientifically described in 1872, with a female specimen as the holotype. A male, the last specimen recorded, was collected in 1875, and these two specimens are the only ones that exist today. The bird became scarce due to deforestation and perhaps hunting, but it was thought to have been finally wiped out by a series of cyclones and storms that hit Rodrigues in the late 19th century. Speculation about the possible survival of the species, though unfounded, lasted as late as 1967.

== Taxonomy ==
Newton's parakeet was first recorded by François Leguat in his 1708 memoir A New Voyage to the East Indies. Leguat was the leader of a group of nine French Huguenot refugees who colonised Rodrigues between 1691 and 1693 after they were marooned there. Subsequent accounts were by Julien Tafforet, who was marooned on the island in 1726, in his Relation de l'Île Rodrigue, and then by the French mathematician Alexandre Pingré, who travelled to Rodrigues to view the 1761 transit of Venus.

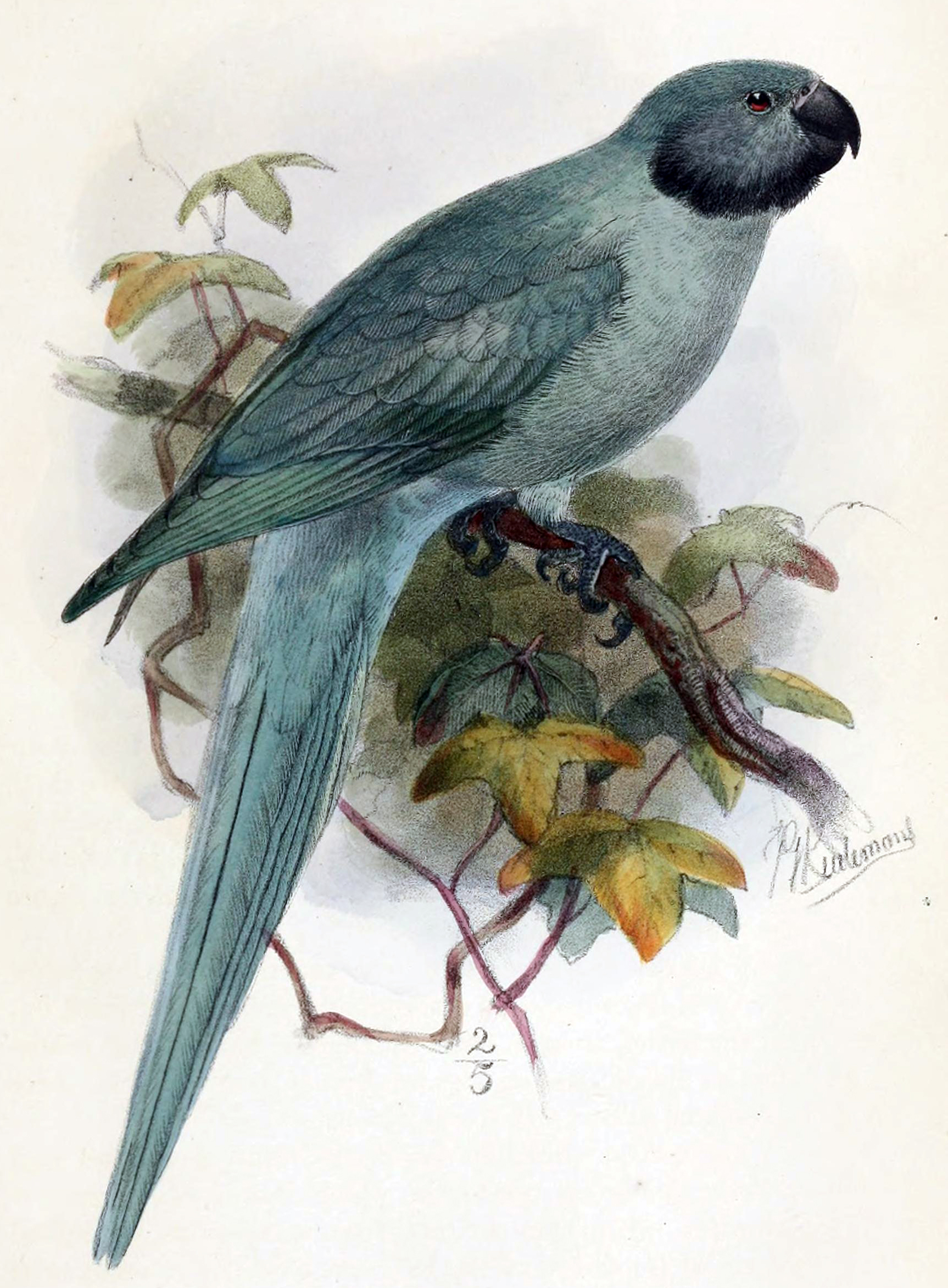
Illustration of the female holotype specimen, by John Gerrard Keulemans, 1875

In 1871, George Jenner, the British magistrate of Rodrigues, collected a female specimen; it was preserved in alcohol and given to Edward Newton, a British colonial administrator in Mauritius, who sent it to his brother, the ornithologist Alfred Newton. A. Newton scientifically described the species in 1872 and gave it the scientific name Palaeornis exsul. "Exsul" ("exiled") refers to Leguat, in that he was exiled from France when he gave the first description of the bird. Newton had tried to find a more descriptive name, perhaps based on colouration, but found it difficult. He refrained from publishing a figure of the female in his original description, though the journal Ibis had offered him the space. He instead wanted to wait until a male specimen could be procured since he imagined it would be more attractive. The female, which is the holotype specimen of the species, is housed in the Cambridge University Museum as specimen UMZC 18/Psi/67/h/1.

A. Newton requested further specimens, especially males, but in 1875 he finally published a plate of the female, lamenting that no male specimens could be found. Tafforet's 1726 account had been rediscovered the previous year, and A. Newton noted that it confirmed his assumption that the male would turn out be much more colourful than the female. Newton's collector, the English naturalist Henry H. Slater, had seen a live Newton's parakeet the year before, but was not carrying a gun at the time. On 14 August 1875, William Vandorous shot a male specimen. It may have been the same specimen Slater had observed. It was subsequently sent to E. Newton by William J. Caldwell. This is the paratype of the species, numbered UMZC 18/Psi/67/h/2 and housed in the Cambridge Museum.

The only two specimens in existence, a male (above) and female, Cambridge University Museum

In 1876, the Newton brothers noted that they had expected the male would be adorned with a red patch on the wing, but that the absence of this indicated it was immature. They still found it more beautiful than the female. These two specimens are the only preserved individuals of the species. The mandible and sternum were extracted from the female specimen, and subfossil remains have since been found in the Plaine Corail caverns on Rodrigues. The American ornithologist James L. Peters used the name Psittacula exsul for Newton's parakeet in his 1937 checklist of birds, replacing the genus name Palaeornis with Psittacula, wherein he also classified other extant parakeets of Asia and Africa.

=== Evolution ===
Based on morphological features, the Alexandrine parakeet (Psittacula eupatria) has been proposed as the founder population for all Psittacula species on Indian Ocean islands, with new populations settling during the species' southwards colonisation from its native South Asia. Features of that species gradually disappear in species further away from its range. Subfossil remains of Newton's parakeet show that it differed from other Mascarene Psittacula species in some osteological features, but also had similarities, such as a reduced sternum, which suggests a close relationship. Skeletal features indicate an especially close relationship with the Alexandrine parakeet and the rose-ringed parakeet (Psittacula krameri), but the many derived features of Newton's parakeet indicates it had long been isolated on Rodrigues.

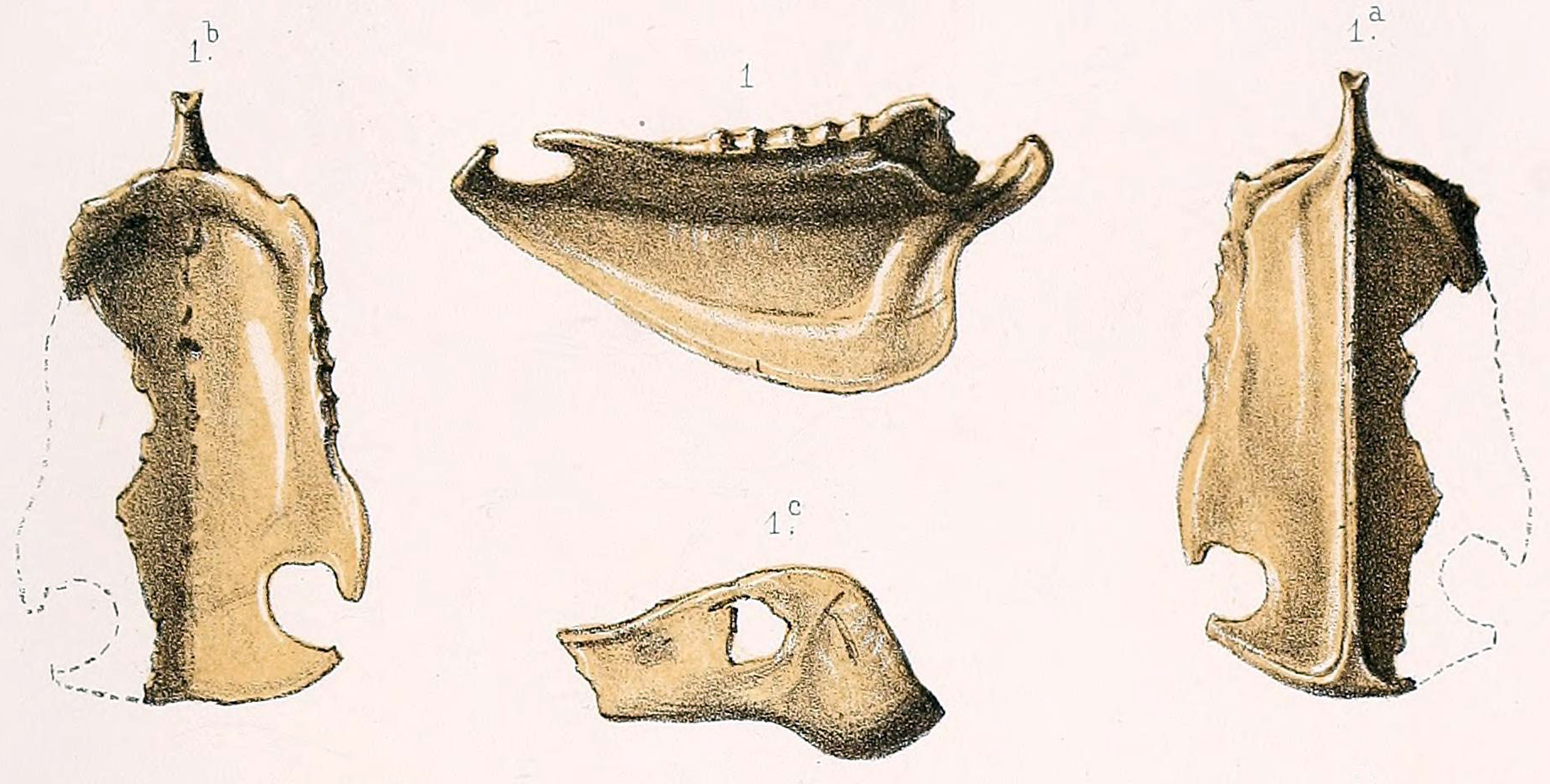
Sternum and mandible extracted from the female specimen, 1875

Many endemic Mascarene birds, including the dodo, are descended from South Asian ancestors, and the British palaeontologist Julian Hume has proposed that this may also be the case for all parrots there. Sea levels were lower during the Pleistocene, so it was possible for species to colonise some of these less isolated islands. Although most extinct parrot species of the Mascarenes are poorly known, subfossil remains show that they shared common features such as enlarged heads and jaws, reduced pectoral bones, and robust leg bones. Hume has suggested that they all have a common origin in the radiation of the tribe Psittaculini, members of which are known as Psittaculines, basing this theory on morphological features and the fact that parrots from that group have managed to colonise many isolated islands in the Indian Ocean. The Psittaculini could have invaded the area several times, as many of the species were so specialised that they may have evolved significantly on hotspot islands before the Mascarenes emerged from the sea. Other members of the genus Psittacula from the Mascarenes include the extant echo parakeet (Psittacula eques echo) of Mauritius, as well as its extinct Réunion subspecies (Psittacula eques eques), and the Mascarene grey parakeet (Psittacula bensoni) of both Mauritius and Réunion.

A 2011 genetic study of parrot phylogeny was unable to include Newton's parakeet, as no viable DNA could be extracted. A 2015 genetic study by the British geneticist Hazel Jackson and colleagues included viable DNA from the toe-pad of the female Newton's parakeet specimen. It was found to group within a clade of rose-ringed parakeet subspecies (from Asia and Africa), which it had diverged from 3.82 million years ago. Furthermore, Newton's parakeet appeared to be ancestral to the parakeets of Mauritius and Réunion. The cladogram accompanying the study is shown below:

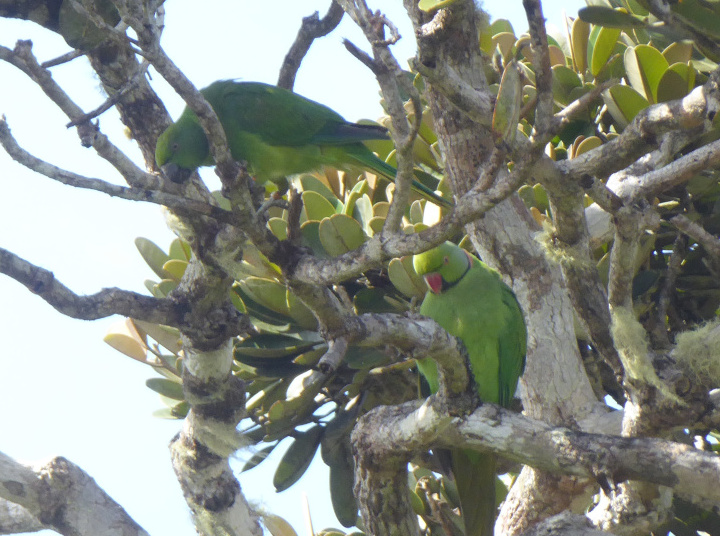
The echo parakeet of nearby Mauritius, the closest living relative

- - - - Psittacula krameri parvirostris (Abyssinian rose-ringed parakeet)
      - - Psittacula krameri manillensis (Indian rose-ringed parakeet)
        - Psittacula krameri borealis (Boreal rose-ringed parakeet)
    - - - Psittacula eques echo (echo parakeet)
        - Psittacula eques eques (Réunion parakeet)
      - Psittacula exsul (Newton's parakeet)
  - Psittacula krameri krameri (African rose-ringed parakeet)

In 2018, the American ornithologist Kaiya L. Provost and colleagues found the Mascarene parrot (Mascarinus marscarinus) and Tanygnathus species to group within Psittacula, making that genus paraphyletic (an unnatural grouping), and stated this argued for breaking up the latter genus. To solve the issue, the German ornithologist Michael P. Braun and colleagues proposed in 2019 that Psittacula should be split into multiple genera. They placed Newton's parakeet in the new genus Alexandrinus, along with its closest relatives, the echo parakeet and the rose-ringed parakeet.

A 2022 genetic study by the Brazilian ornithologist Alexandre P. Selvatti and colleagues confirmed the earlier studies in regard to the relationship between Psittacula, the Mascarene parrot, and Tanygnathus. They suggested that Psittaculinae originated in the Australo–Pacific region (then part of the supercontinent Gondwana), and that the ancestral population of the Psittacula–Mascarinus lineage were the first psittaculines in Africa by the late Miocene (8–5 million years ago), and colonised the Mascarenes from there.

== Description ==
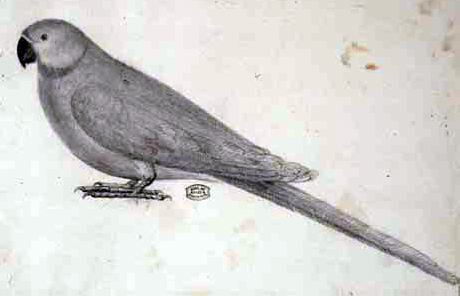
Jossigny's other 1770s life drawing

Newton's parakeet was about 40 cm (16 in) long – roughly the size of the rose-ringed parakeet. The wing of the male specimen was 198 mm (7.8 in), the tail 206 mm (8.1 in), the culmen 25 mm (0.98 in), and the tarsus was 22 mm (0.87 in). The wing of the female specimen was 191 mm (7.5 in), the tail 210 mm (8.3 in), the culmen 24 mm (0.94 in), and the tarsus was 22 mm (0.87 in). The male specimen was greyish blue (also described as "slatey blue") tinged with green, and darker above. The head was bluer, with a dark line running from the eye to the cere. It had a broad black collar running from the chin to the nape, where it became gradually narrower. The underside of the tail was greyish, the upper beak was dark reddish brown, and the mandible was black. The legs were grey and the iris yellow. The female was similar but had a greyer head and a black beak. The black collar was not so prominent as that of the male and did not extend to the back of the neck.

The general appearance of Newton's parakeet was similar to the extant Psittacula species, including the black collar, but the bluish grey colouration set it apart from other members of its genus, which are mostly green. It differed from its Mascarene relatives in some skeletal details, including in that the internal margin of the mandibular symphysis (where the two halves of the lower jaw connected) was oval instead of square-shaped when seen from above, and in that the upper end of the humerus (upper arm bone) was less expanded than in the Mascarene grey parakeet and the echo parakeet.

=== Possible colour variation ===
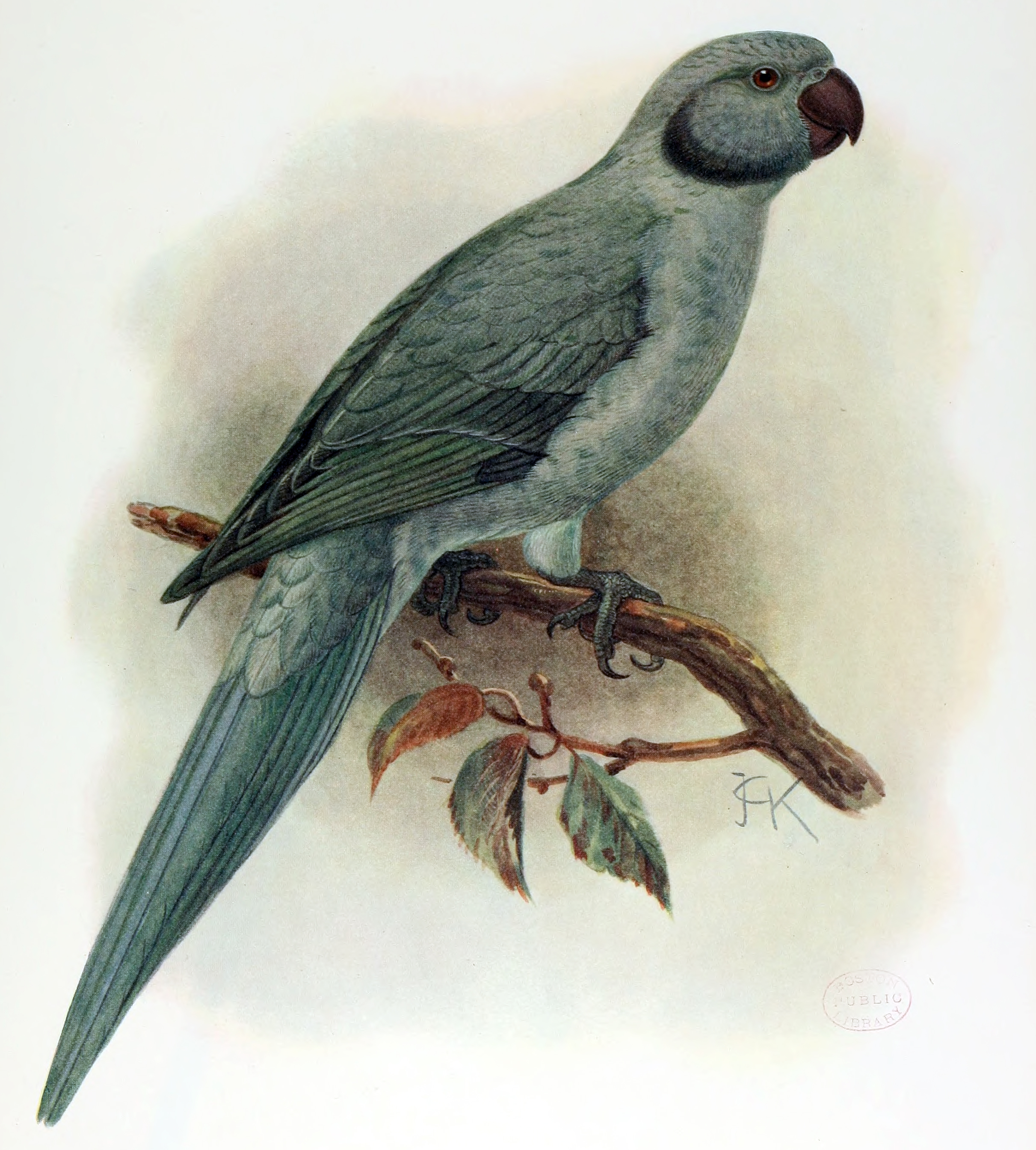
Keulemans' plate from Walter Rothschild's 1907 book Extinct Birds, based on his 1875 illustration of the female specimen

The French naturalist Philibert Commerson received a live specimen on Mauritius in the 1770s and described it as "greyish blue". French artist Paul Philippe Sanguin de Jossigny made two illustrations of this specimen, the only known depictions of Newton's parakeet in life, unpublished until 2007. Though both existing specimens are blue, some early accounts from Rodrigues have caused confusion over the colouration of the plumage. One of these is Leguat's following statement:

There are abundance of green and blew Parrets, they are of a midling and equal bigness; when they are young, their Flesh is as good as young Pigeons.

If the green parrots Leguat referred to were not the Rodrigues parrot (Necropsittacus rodericanus), they might perhaps have been a green colour morph of Newton's parakeet, as Hume has suggested. As A. Newton observed in his original description, some feathers of the female specimen display both blue and green tinges, depending on the light. This may explain some of the discrepancies. According to Fuller, the green parrots mentioned could also instead have been storm-blown members of Psittacula species from other islands, that survived on Rodrigues for a short time.

The two existing specimens were originally preserved in alcohol, but though this can discolour specimens, it is not probable that it could turn green to blue. Hume and the Dutch orhinthologist Hein van Grouw have also suggested that due to an inheritable mutation, some Newton's parakeets may have lacked psittacin, a pigment that together with eumelanin produces green colouration in parrot feathers. Complete lack of psittacin produces blue colouration, whereas reduced psittacin can produce a colour between green and blue called parblue, which corresponds to the colour of the two preserved Newton's parakeet specimens. The reason why only parblue specimens are known today may be due to collecting bias, as unusually coloured specimens are more likely to be collected than those of normal colour.

Tafforet also described what appears to be green Newton's parakeets, but the issue of colouration was further complicated by the mention of red plumage:

The parrots are of three kinds, and in quantity ... The second species [mature male Newton's parakeet?] is slightly smaller and more beautiful, because they have their plumage green like the preceding [Rodrigues Parrot], a little more blue, and above the wings a little red as well as their beak. The third species [Newton's parakeet] is small and altogether green, and the beak black.

In 1987, the British ecologist Anthony S. Cheke proposed that the last two types mentioned were male and female Newton's parakeets, and that the differences between them were due to sexual dimorphism. The last bird mentioned had earlier been identified as introduced grey-headed lovebirds (Agapornis canus) by A. Newton, but Cheke did not find this likely, as their beaks are grey. Pingré also mentioned green birds, perhaps with some red colours, but his account is partially unintelligible and therefore ambiguous. A red shoulder patch is also present on the related Alexandrine parakeet. None of the existing Newton's parakeet specimens have red patches. Fuller suggested the single known male specimen may have been immature, judged on the colour of its beak, and this may also explain the absence of the red patch. When Psittacula are bred by aviculturalists, blue is easily produced from green; the production of blue may suppress red colouration, so blue morphs may have lacked the red patch.

== Behaviour and ecology ==
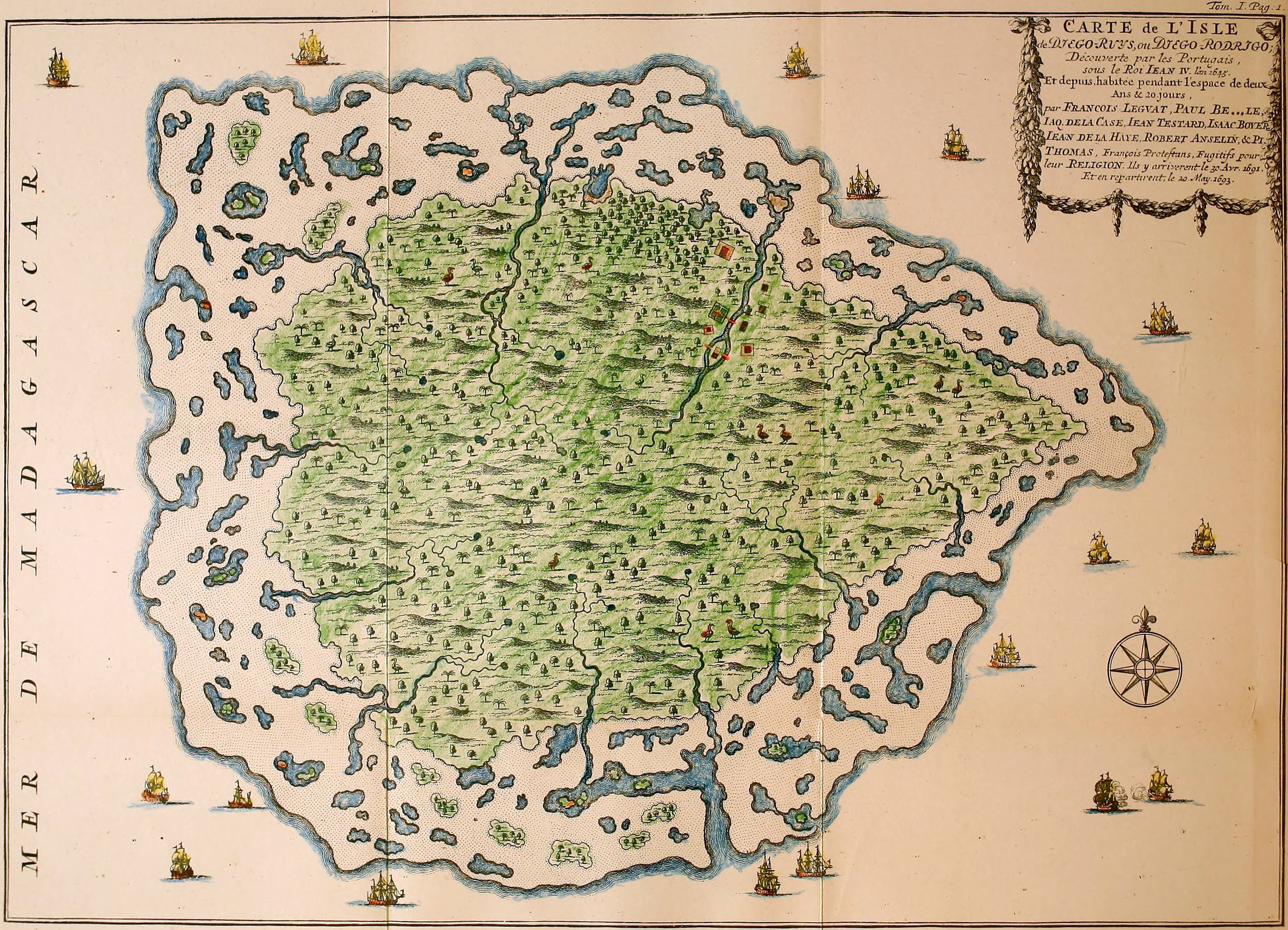
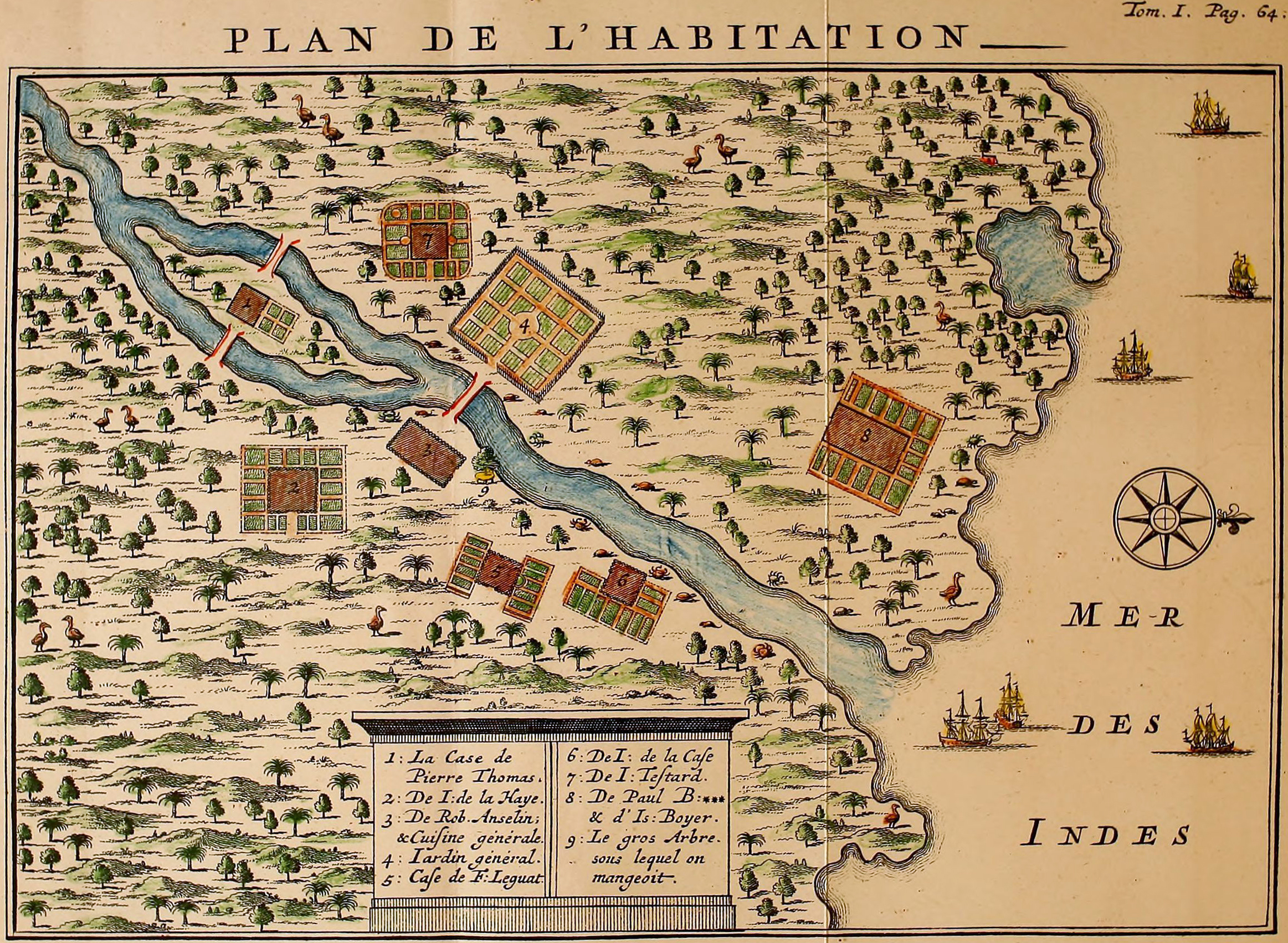
François Leguat's 1708 maps of Rodrigues and his settlement

Almost nothing is known about the behaviour of Newton's parakeet, but it is probable that it was similar to that of other members of its genus, such as the echo parakeet. Leguat mentioned that the parrots of the island ate the nuts of the bois d'olive tree (Cassine orientalis). Tafforet also stated that the parrots ate the seeds of the bois de buis shrub (Fernelia buxifolia), which is endangered today, but was common all over Rodrigues and nearby islets during his visit. Newton's parakeet may have fed on leaves as the related echo parakeet does. The fact that it survived long after Rodrigues had been heavily deforested shows that its ecology was less vulnerable than that of, for example, the Rodrigues parrot.

Leguat and his men were hesitant to hunt the parrots of Rodrigues because they were so tame and easy to catch. Leguat's group took a parrot as a pet and were able to teach it to speak:

Hunting and Fishing were so easie to us, that it took away from the Pleasure. We often delighted ourselves in teaching the Parrots to speak, there being vast numbers of them. We carried one to Maurice Isle [Mauritius], which talk'd French and Flemish.

The authors of the 2015 study which resolved the phylogenetic placement of the Mascarene island parakeets suggested that the echo parakeet of Mauritius would be a suitable ecological replacement for the Réunion parakeet and Newton's parakeet, due to their close evolutionary relationship. The echo parakeet was itself close to extinction in the 1980s, numbering only twenty individuals, but has since recovered, so introducing it to the nearby islands could also help secure the survival of this species.

Many other species endemic to Rodrigues became extinct after humans arrived, and the island's ecosystem remains heavily damaged. Forests had covered the entire island before humans arrived, but very little forestation can be seen today. Newton's parakeet lived alongside other recently extinct birds such as the Rodrigues solitaire, the Rodrigues parrot, the Rodrigues rail, the Rodrigues starling, the Rodrigues scops owl, the Rodrigues night heron, and the Rodrigues pigeon. Extinct reptiles include the domed Rodrigues giant tortoise, the saddle-backed Rodrigues giant tortoise, and the Rodrigues day gecko.

== Extinction ==
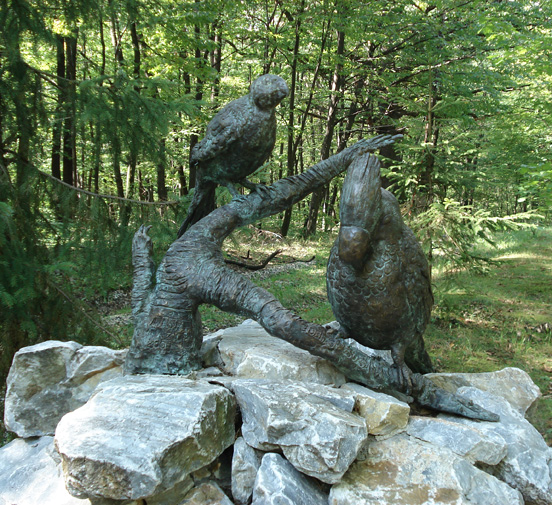
Statues in Hungary of Newton's parakeet and the also extinct broad-billed parrot of Mauritius

Of the roughly eight parrot species endemic to the Mascarenes, only the echo parakeet has survived. The others were likely all made extinct by a combination of excessive hunting and deforestation by humans. Leguat stated that Newton's parakeet was abundant during his stay. It was still common when Tafforet visited in 1726, but when Pingré mentioned it in 1761, he noted that the bird had become scarce. It was still present on southern islets off Rodrigues (Isle Gombrani), along with the Rodrigues parrot. After this point, much of Rodrigues was severely deforested and used for livestock.

According to early accounts praising its flavour, it appears visitors commonly ate Newton's parakeet. Several individuals would likely be needed to provide a single meal, owing to the bird's small size. Pingré stated:

The perruche [Newton's parakeet] seemed to me much more delicate [than the flying-fox]. I would not have missed any game from France if this one had been commoner in Rodrigues; but it begins to become rare. There are even fewer perroquets [Rodrigues parrots], although there were once a big enough quantity according to François Leguat; indeed a little islet south of Rodrigues still retains the name Isle of Parrots [Isle Pierrot].

According to government surveyor Thomas Corby, Newton's parakeet may still have been fairly common in 1843. Slater reported that he saw a single specimen in southwestern Rodrigues during his three-month stay to observe the 1874 Transit of Venus, and assistant colonial secretary William J. Caldwell saw several specimens in 1875 during his own three-month visit. The male that he received in 1875 and gave to Newton is the last recorded member of the species. A series of cyclones struck the following year and may have devastated the remaining population. Further severe storms hit in 1878 and 1886, and since few forested areas were left by this time, there was little cover to protect any remaining birds. The male could, therefore, have been the last of the species alive.

There were unfounded rumours of its continued existence until the beginning of the 20th century. In 1967, the American ornithologist James Greenway stated that an extremely small population might still survive on small offshore islets, since this is often the last refuge of endangered birds. The Mauritian ornithologist France Staub stated in 1973 that his visits to Rodrigues the previous seven years confirmed the bird was extinct. Hume concluded in 2007 that the islets were probably too small to sustain a population.
