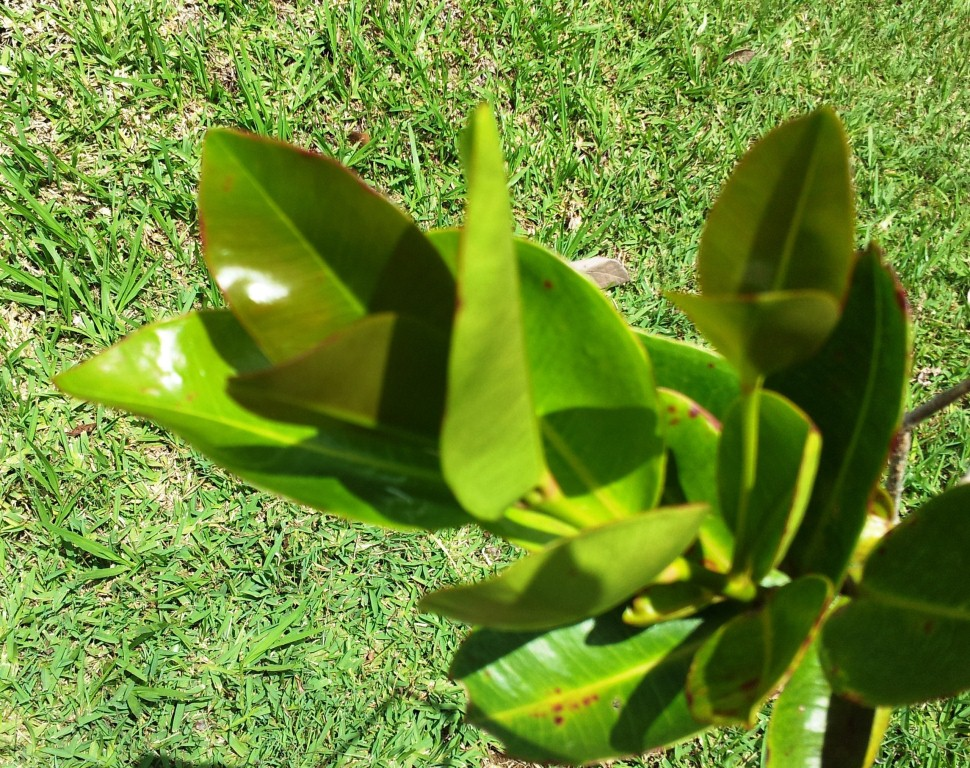
- Foliage

Scientific classification
- Kingdom: Plantae
- Clade: Tracheophytes
- Clade: Angiosperms
- Clade: Eudicots
- Clade: Rosids
- Order: Myrtales
- Family: Myrtaceae
- Genus: Syzygium
- Species: S. contractum

Binomial name
- Syzygium contractum (Poir.) J.Guého & A.J.Scott

Synonyms
- Eugenia contracta Poir.

= Syzygium contractum =

Species of flowering plant

Syzygium contractum is a species of plant in the clove and eucalyptus family Myrtaceae. It is endemic to the island of Mauritius.
