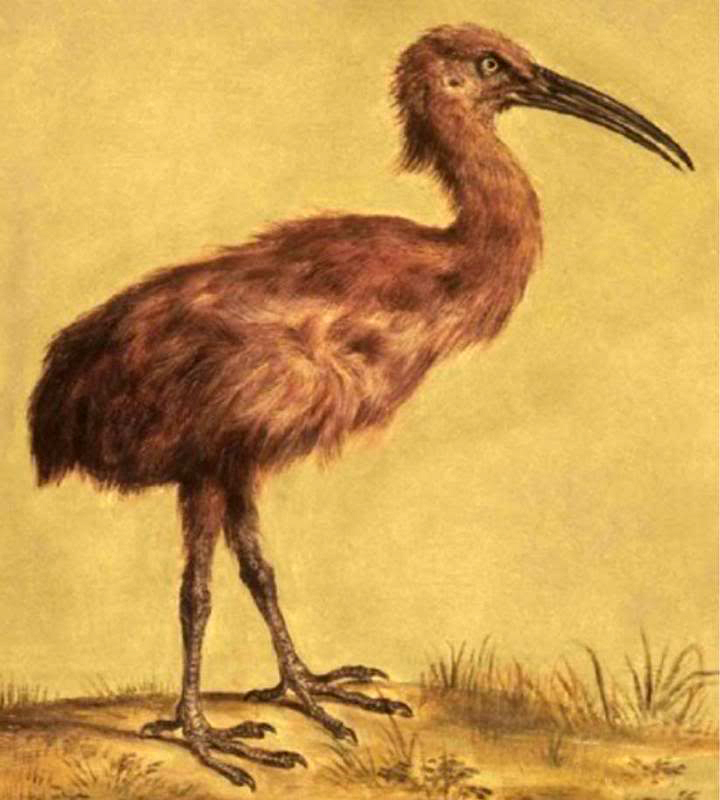
- Painting of a possibly stuffed specimen by Jacob Hoefnagel, ca. 1610

Conservation status
- Extinct (shortly after 1693) (IUCN 3.1)

Scientific classification
- Kingdom: Animalia
- Phylum: Chordata
- Class: Aves
- Order: Gruiformes
- Family: Rallidae
- Genus: †Aphanapteryx; Frauenfeld, 1868
- Species: †A. bonasia

Binomial name
- †Aphanapteryx bonasia (de Sélys-Longchamps, 1848)
- Location of Mauritius (in blue)

Synonyms
- List: Apterornis bonasia Selys, 1848; Didus broecki Schlegel, 1854; Didus herbertii Schlegel, 1854; Aphanapteryx imperialis Frauenfeld, 1868; Aphanapteryx imperatoris Frauenfeld, 1868; Aphanapteryx broeckei (Milne-Edwards, 1868); Didus herberti Milne-Edwards, 1868; Didus broeckii Milne-Edwards, 1868; Aphanapteryx broeckii Milne-Edwards, 1869; Pezophaps broeckei (Schlegel, 1873); Pezophaps herbertii (Schlegel, 1873); Aphanapteryx broecki Günther & Newton, 1879; Aphanapteryx broekei Newton & Gadow, 1893; Kuina mundyi Hachisuka, 1937; Pezocrex herberti (Hachisuka, 1953)

= Red rail =

Extinct species of flightless rail which was endemic to Mauritius

The red rail (Aphanapteryx bonasia) is an extinct species of rail that was endemic to the Mascarene island of Mauritius, east of Madagascar in the Indian Ocean. It had a close relative on Rodrigues island, the likewise extinct Rodrigues rail (Erythromachus leguati), with which it is sometimes considered congeneric, but their relationship with other rails is unclear. Rails often evolve flightlessness when adapting to isolated islands, free of mammalian predators, and that was also the case for this species. The red rail was a little larger than a chicken and had reddish, hairlike plumage, with dark legs and a long, curved beak. The wings were small, and its legs were slender for a bird of its size. It was similar to the Rodrigues rail, but was larger, and had proportionally shorter wings. It has been compared to a kiwi or a limpkin in appearance and behaviour.

This bird is believed to have fed on invertebrates, and snail shells have been found with damage matching an attack by its beak. Human hunters took advantage of an attraction red rails had to red objects by using coloured cloth to lure the birds so that they could be beaten with sticks. Until subfossil remains were discovered in the 1860s, scientists only knew the red rail from 17th century descriptions and illustrations. These were thought to represent several different species, which resulted in a large number of invalid junior synonyms. It has been suggested that all late 17th-century accounts of the dodo actually referred to the red rail, after the former had become extinct. The last mention of a red rail sighting is from 1693, and it is thought to have gone extinct around 1700, due to predation by humans and introduced species.

== Taxonomy ==
The red rail was first mentioned as "Indian river woodcocks" by the Dutch ships' pilot Heyndrick Dircksz Jolinck in 1598. By the 19th century, the bird was known only from a few contemporary descriptions referring to red "hens" and names otherwise used for grouse or partridges in Europe, as well as the sketches of the Dutch merchant Pieter van den Broecke and the English traveller Sir Thomas Herbert from 1646 and 1634. While they differed in some details, they were thought to depict a single species by the English naturalist Hugh Edwin Strickland in 1848. The same year, the Belgian scientist Edmond de Sélys Longchamps coined the scientific name Apterornis bonasia based on the old accounts mentioned by Strickland. He also included two other Mascarene birds, at the time only known from contemporary accounts, in the genus Apterornis: the Réunion ibis (now Threskiornis solitarius); and the Réunion swamphen (now Porphyrio caerulescens). He thought them related to the dodo and Rodrigues solitaire, due to their shared rudimentary wings, tail, and the disposition of their digits.

The name Apterornis had already been used for a different extinct bird genus from New Zealand (originally spelled Aptornis, the adzebills) by the British biologist Richard Owen earlier in 1848. The meaning of bonasia is unclear. Some early accounts refer to red rails by the vernacular names for the hazel grouse, Tetrastes bonasia, so the name evidently originates there. The name itself perhaps refers to bonasus, meaning "bull" in Latin, or bonum and assum, meaning "good roast". The allusion to bulls may be due the bird being said to have had a similar attraction to the waving of red cloth. It has also been suggested to be a Latin form of the French word bonasse, meaning simple-minded or good-natured.

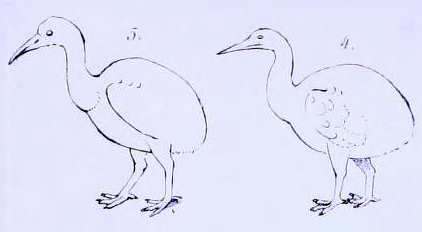
Hermann Schlegel's 1854 outlines of "dodo" species (the second supposedly from Rodrigues), which were actually red rails seen by travellers on Mauritius

The German ornithologist Hermann Schlegel thought van den Broecke's sketch depicted a smaller dodo species from Mauritius, and that the Herbert sketch showed a dodo from Rodrigues, and named them Didus broecki and Didus herberti in 1854. In 1968, the Austrian naturalist Georg Ritter von Frauenfeld brought attention to paintings by the Flemish artist Jacob Hoefnagel depicting animals in the royal menagerie of Emperor Rudolph II in Prague, including a dodo and a bird he named Aphanapteryx imperialis. Aphanapteryx means "invisible-wing", from Greek aphanēs, unseen, and pteryx, wing. He compared it with the birds earlier named form old accounts, and found its beak similar to that of a kiwi or ibis.

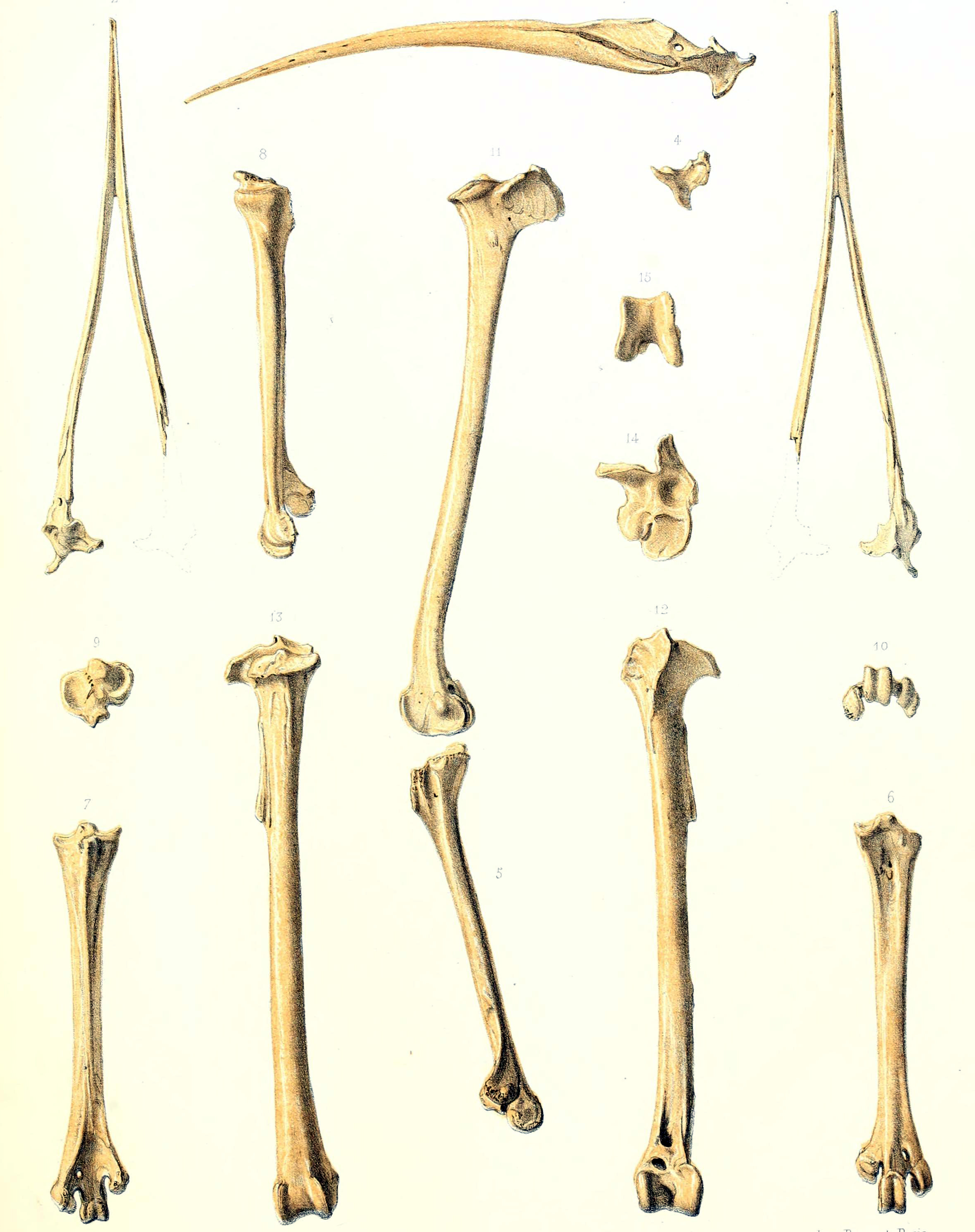
First known subfossils which were used to identify this bird as a rail in 1868

In 1865, subfossil foot bones and a lower jaw were found along with remains of other Mauritian animals in the Mare aux Songes swamp, and were sent by the British ornithologists Edward Newton to the French zoologist Alphonse Milne-Edwards, who identified them as belonging to a rail in 1868. Milne-Edwards correlated the bones with the bird in the Hoefnagel painting and the old accounts, and combined the genus name Aphanapteryx with the older specific name broecki. Due to nomenclatural priority, the genus name was later combined with the oldest species name bonasia. In the 1860s, the travel journal of the Dutch East India Company ship Gelderland (1601–1603) was rediscovered, which contains good sketches of several now-extinct Mauritian birds attributed to the Dutch artist Joris Laerle, including an unlabelled red rail.

More fossils were later found by the French naturalist Theodore Sauzier, who had been commissioned to explore the "historical souvenirs" of Mauritius in 1889, and these were described by Newton and the German ornithologist Hans F. Gadow in 1893. In 1899, an almost complete specimen was found by the French barber Louis Etienne Thirioux, who also found important dodo remains, in a cave in the Vallée des Prêtres; this is the most completely known red rail specimen, and is catalogued as MI 923 in the Mauritius Institute. The second most complete individual (specimen CMNZ AV6284) also mainly consists of bones from the Thirioux collection. More material has since been found in various settings. The yellowish colouration mentioned by English traveller Peter Mundy in 1638 instead of the red of other accounts was used by the Japanese ornithologist Masauji Hachisuka in 1937 as an argument for this referring to a distinct genus and species, Kuina mundyi (the generic name means "water-rail" in Japanese), but the American ornithologist Storrs L. Olson suggested in 1977 that it was possibly due to the observed bird being a juvenile red rail.

=== Evolution ===
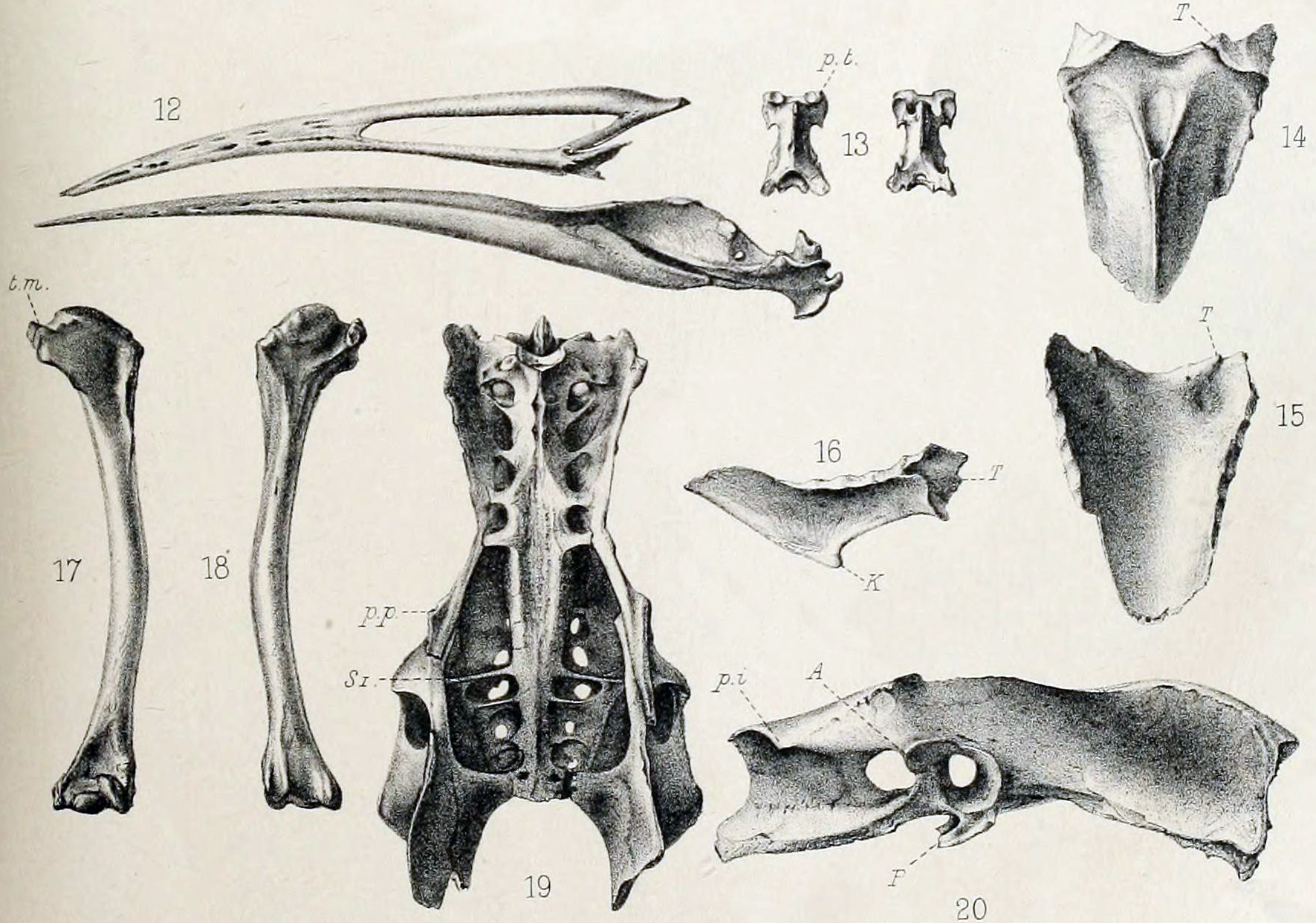
Subfossils described in 1893

Apart from being a close relative of the likewise extinct Rodrigues rail, the relationships of the red rail are uncertain. The two are commonly kept as separate genera, Aphanapteryx and Erythromachus, but have also been united as species of Aphanapteryx at times. They were first generically synonymised by Newton and Albert Günther in 1879, due to skeletal similarities. In 1892, the Scottish naturalist Henry Ogg Forbes described Hawkins's rail, an extinct species of rail from the Chatham Islands located east of New Zealand, as a new species of Aphanapteryx; A. hawkinsi. He found the Chatham Islands species more similar to the red rail than the latter was to the Rodrigues rail, and proposed that the Mascarene Islands had once been connected with the Chatham Islands, as part of a lost continent he called "Antipodea". Forbes moved the Chatham Islands bird to its own genus, Diaphorapteryx, in 1893, on the recommendation of Newton, but later reverted to his older name. The idea that the Chatham Islands bird was closely related to the red rail and the idea of a connection between the Mascarenes and the Chatham Islands were later criticised by the British palaeontologist Charles William Andrews due to no other species being shared between the islands, and Gadow explained the similarity between the two rails as parallel evolution.

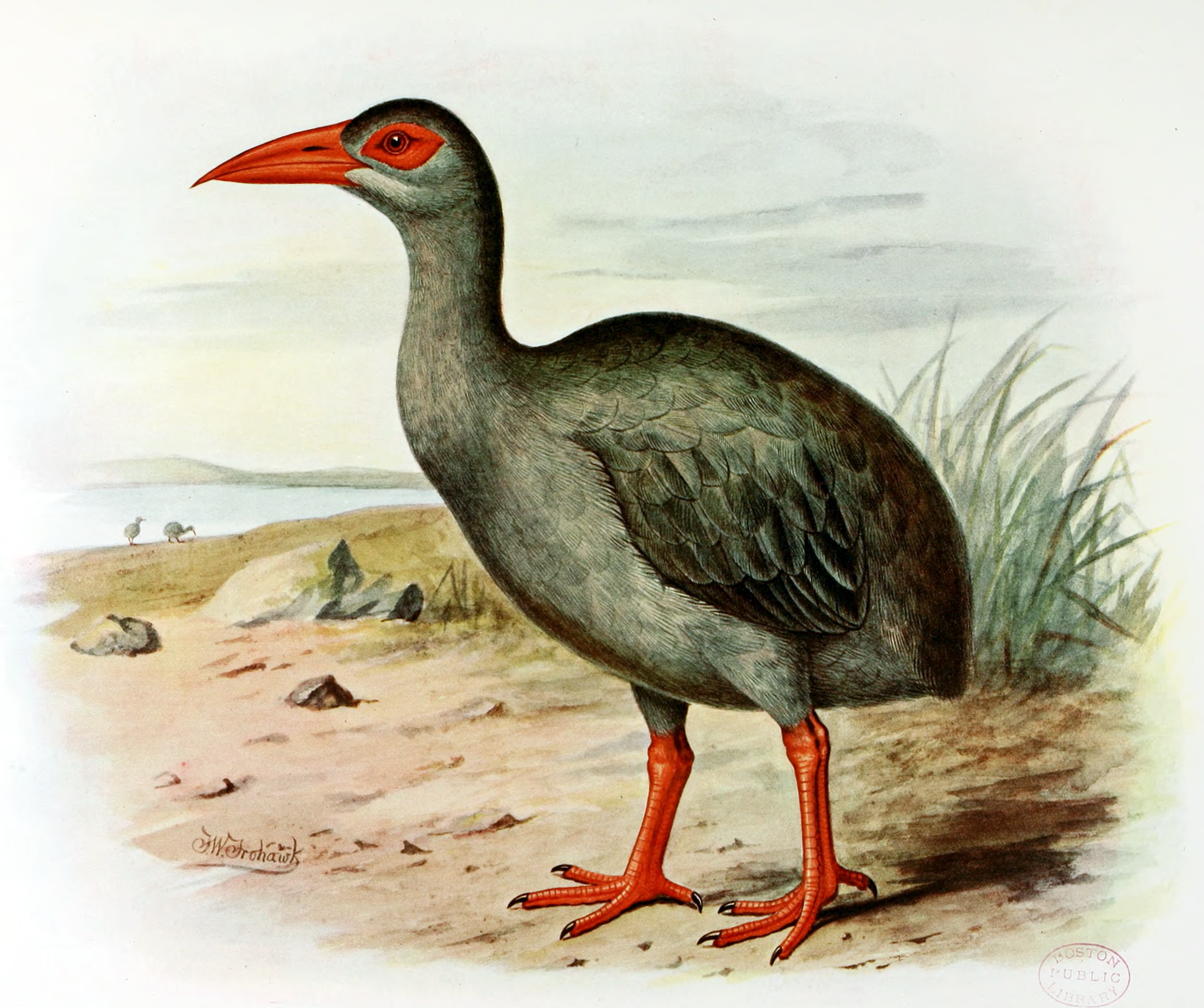
1907 life restoration of the related Rodrigues rail by Frederick William Frohawk

In 1945, the French palaeontologist Jean Piveteau found skull features of the red and Rodrigues rail different enough for generic separation, and in 1977, Olson stated that though the two species were similar and derived from the same stock, they had also diverged considerably, and should possibly be kept separate. Based on geographic location and the morphology of the nasal bones, Olson suggested that they were related to the genera Gallirallus, Dryolimnas, Atlantisia, and Rallus. The American ornithologist Bradley C. Livezey was unable to determine the affinities of the red and Rodrigues rail in 1998, stating that some of the features uniting them and some other rails were associated with the loss of flight rather than common descent. He also suggested that the grouping of the red and Rodrigues rail into the same genus may have been influenced by their geographical distribution. The French palaeontologist Cécile Mourer-Chauviré and colleagues also considered the two as belonging to separate genera in 1999.

Rails have reached many oceanic archipelagos, which has frequently led to speciation and evolution of flightlessness. According to the British researchers Anthony S. Cheke and Julian P. Hume in 2008, the fact that the red rail lost much of its feather structure indicates it was isolated for a long time. These rails may be of Asian origin, like many other Mascarene birds. In 2019, Hume supported the distinction of the two genera, and cited the relation between the extinct Mauritius scops owl and the Rodrigues scops owl as another example of the diverging evolutionary paths on these islands. He stated that the relationships of the red and Rodrigues rails was more unclear than that of other extinct Mascarene rails, with many of their distinct features being related to flightlessness and modifications to their jaws due to their diet, suggesting long time isolation. He suggested their ancestors could have arrived on the Mascarenes during the middle Miocene at the earliest, but it may have happened more recently. The speed of which these features evolved may also have been affected by gene flow, resource availability, and climate events, and flightlessness can evolve rapidly in rails, as well as repeatedly within the same groups, as seen in for example Dryolimnas, so the distinctness of the red and Rodrigues rails may not have taken long to evolve (some other specialised rails evolved in less than 1–3 million years). Hume suggested that the two rails were probably related to Dryolimnas, but their considerably different morphology made it difficult to establish how. In general, rails are adept at colonising islands, and can become flightless within few generations in suitable environments, for example without predators, yet this also makes them vulnerable to human activities.

== Description ==
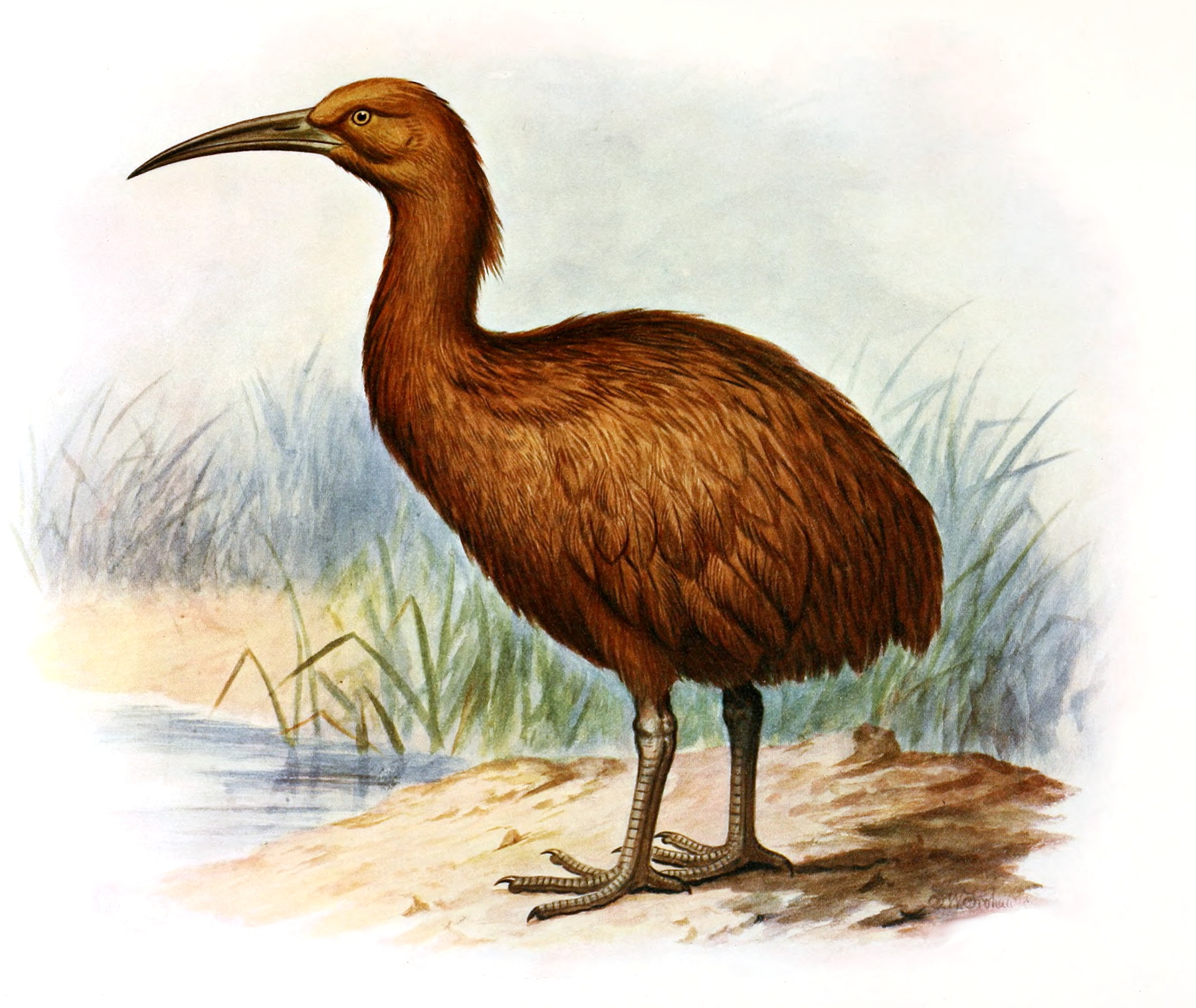
1907 life restoration by Frohawk

From the subfossil bones, illustrations and descriptions, it is known that the red rail was a flightless bird, somewhat larger than a chicken. Subfossil specimens range in size, which may indicate sexual dimorphism, as is common among rails. It was about 35–40 cm (14–16 in) long, and the male may have weighed 1.3 kg (2.9 lb) and the female 1 kg (2.2 lb). Its plumage was reddish brown all over, and the feathers were fluffy and hairlike; the tail was not visible in the living bird and the short wings likewise also nearly disappeared in the plumage. It had a long, slightly curved, brown bill, and some illustrations suggest it had a nape crest. The bird perhaps resembled a lightly built kiwi, and it has also been likened to a limpkin, both in appearance and behaviour.

The cranium of the red rail was the largest among Mascarene rails, and was compressed from top to bottom in side view. The premaxilla that comprised most of the upper bill was long (nearly 47% longer than the cranium) and narrow, and ended in a sharp point. The narial (nostril) openings were 50% of the rostrum's length, and prominent, elongate foramina (openings) ran almost to the front edge of the narial opening. The mandibular rostrum of the lower jaw was long, with the length of the mandibular symphysis (where the halves of the mandible connect) being about 79% of the cranium's length. The mandible had large, deep set foramina, which ran almost up to a deep sulcus (furrow). Hume examined all available upper beaks in 2019, and while he found no differences in curvature, he thought the differences in length was most likely due to sexual dimorphism.

The scapula (shoulder blade) was wide in side view, and the coracoid was comparatively short, with a wide shaft. The sternum (breast bone) and humerus (upper arm bone) were small, indicating that it had lost the power of flight. The humerus was 60–66 mm (2.4–2.6 in), and its shaft was strongly curved from top to bottom. The ulna (lower arm bone) was short and strongly arched from top to bottom. Its legs were long and slender for such a large bird, but the pelvis was very wide, robust, and compact, and was 60 mm (2.4 in) in length. The femur (thigh-bone) was very robust, 69–71 mm (2.7–2.8 in) long, and the upper part of the shaft was strongly arched. The tibiotarsus (lower leg bone) was large and robust, especially the upper and lower ends, and was 98–115 mm (3.9–4.5 in) long. The fibula was short and robust. The tarsometatarsus (ankle bone) was large and robust, and 79 mm (3.1 in) long. The red rail differed from the Rodrigues rail in having a proportionately shorter humerus, a narrower and longer skull, and having shorter and higher nostrils. They differed considerably in plumage, based on early descriptions. The red rail was also larger, with somewhat smaller wings, but their leg proportions were similar. The pelvis and sacrum was also similar. The Dutch ornithologist Marc Herremans suggested in 1989 that the red and Rodrigues rails were neotenic, with juvenile features such as weak pectoral apparatuses and downy plumage.

=== Contemporary descriptions ===
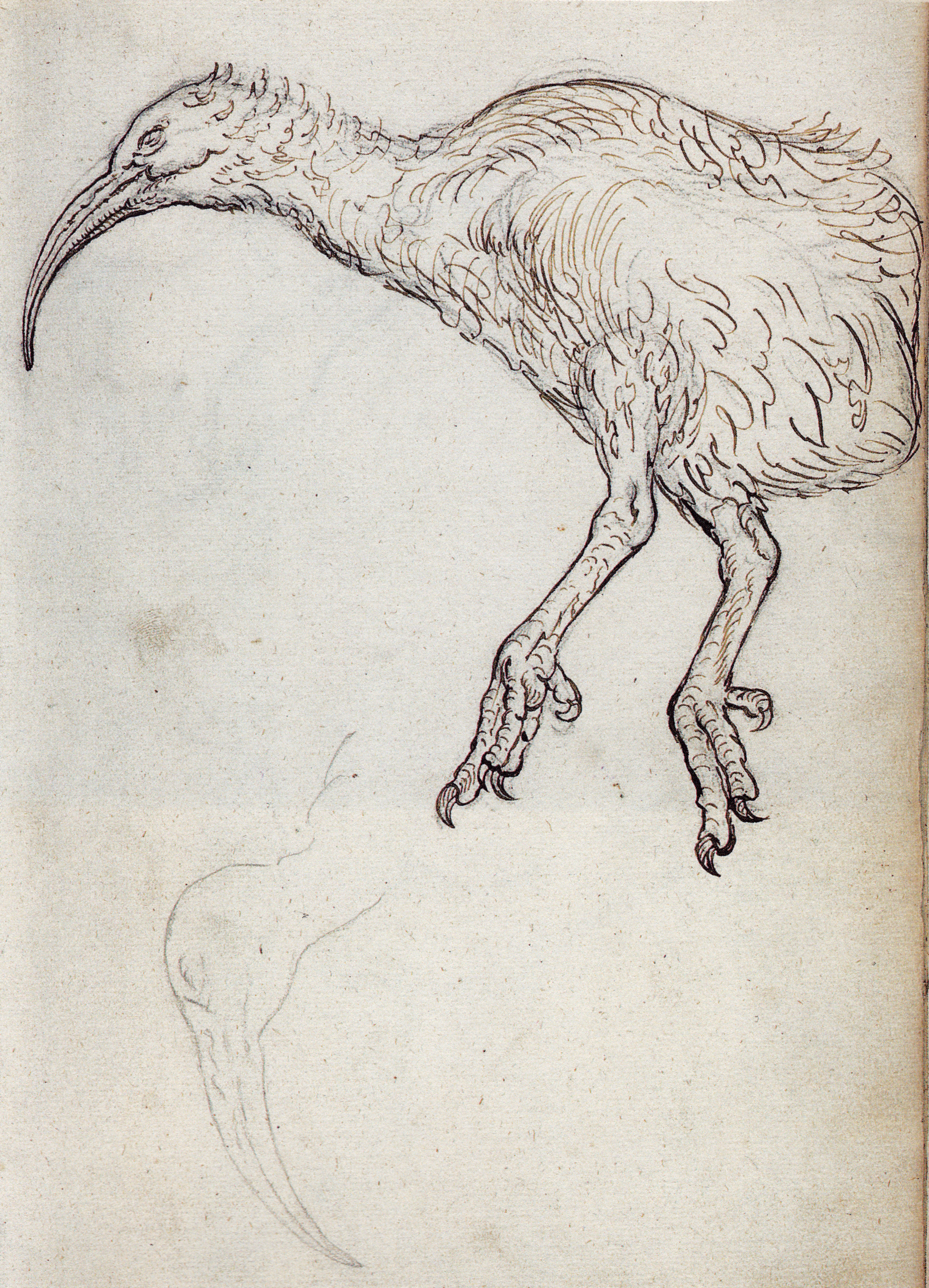
1601 sketches of a killed or stunned specimen, attributted to Joris Laerle

Mundy visited Mauritius in 1638 and described the red rail as follows:

A Mauritius henne, a Fowle as bigge as our English hennes, of a yellowish Wheaten Colour, of which we only got one. It hath a long, Crooked sharpe pointed bill. Feathered all over, butte on their wings they are soe Few and smalle that they cannot with them raise themselves From the ground. There is a pretty way of taking them with a red cap, but this of ours was taken with a stick. They bee very good Meat, and are also Cloven footed, soe that they can Neyther Fly nor Swymme.

Another English traveller, John Marshall, described the bird as follows in 1668:

Here are also great plenty of Dodos or red hens which are larger a little than our English henns, have long beakes and no, or very little Tayles. Their fethers are like down, and their wings so little that it is not able to support their bodies; but they have long leggs and will runn very fast, and that a man shall not catch them, they will turn so about in the trees. They are good meate when roasted, tasting something like a pig, and their skin like pig skin when roosted, being hard.

=== Contemporary depictions ===
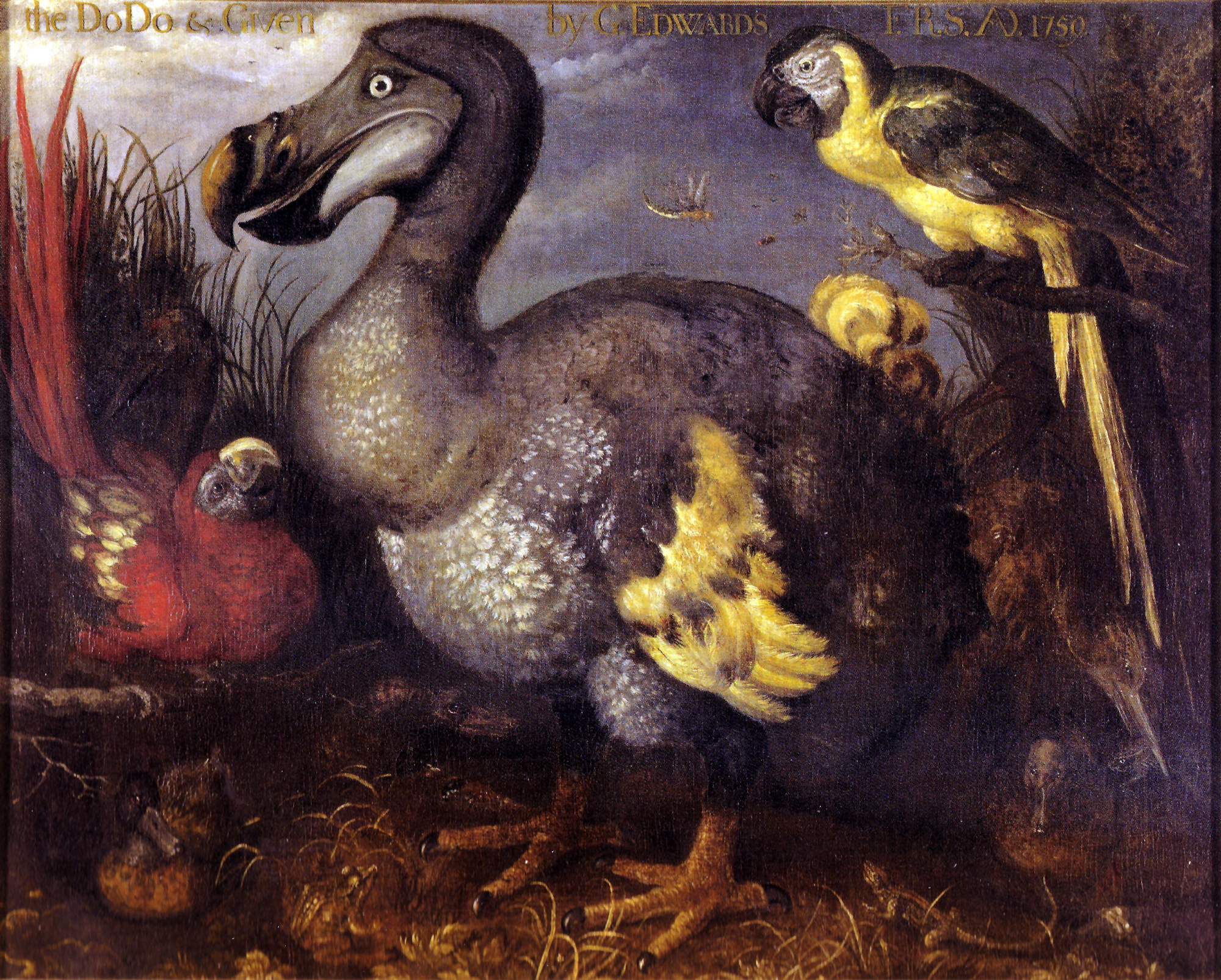
Edwards' Dodo, a 1626 painting by Roelant Savery, possibly showing a red rail (or a bittern) in the lower right

The two most realistic contemporary depictions of red rails, the Hoefnagel painting from ca. 1610 and the sketches from the Gelderland ship's journal from 1601 attributed to Laerle, where brought to attention in the 19th century. Much information about the bird's appearance comes from Hoefnagel's painting, based on a bird in the menagerie of Emperor Rudolph II around 1610. It is the only unequivocal coloured depiction of the species, showing the plumage as reddish brown, but it is unknown whether it was based on a stuffed or living specimen. The bird had most likely been brought alive to Europe, as it is unlikely that taxidermists were on board the visiting ships, and spirits were not yet used to preserve biological specimens. Most tropical specimens were preserved as dried heads and feet. It had probably lived in the emperor's zoo for a while together with the other animals painted for the same series. The painting was discovered in the emperor's collection and published in 1868 by Georg von Frauenfeld, along with a painting of a dodo from the same collection and artist. This specimen is thought to have been the only red rail that ever reached Europe.

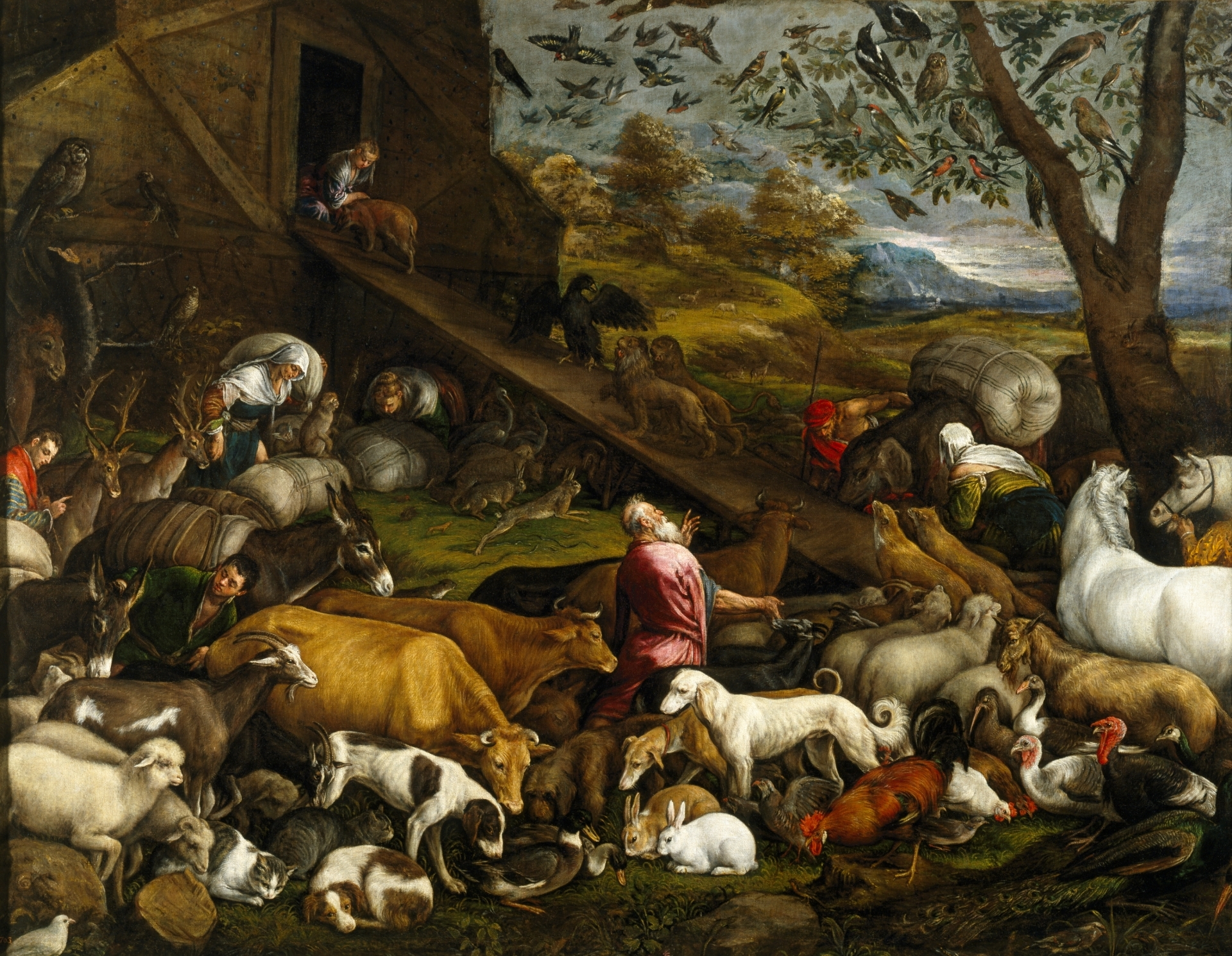
Jacopo Bassano's 1570 painting Arca di Noè, perhaps showing a red rail (or a bittern) in the lower right

The red rail depicted in the Gelderland journal appears to have been stunned or killed, and the sketch is the earliest record of the species. It is the only illustration of the species drawn on Mauritius, and according to Hume, the most accurate depiction. The image was sketched with pencil and finished in ink, but details such as a deeper beak and the shoulder of the wing are only seen in the underlying sketch. In addition, there are three rather crude black-and-white sketches, but differences in them were enough for some authors to suggest that each image depicted a distinct species, leading to the creation of several scientific names which are now synonyms. An illustration in van den Broecke's 1646 account (based on his stay on Mauritius in 1617) shows a red rail next to a dodo and a one-horned goat, but is not referenced in the text. An illustration in Herbert's 1634 account (based on his stay in 1629) shows a red rail between a broad-billed parrot and a dodo, and has been referred to as "extremely crude" by Hume. Mundy's 1638 illustration was published in 1919.

As suggested by Greenway, there are also depictions of what appears to be a red rail in three of the Dutch artist Roelant Savery's paintings. In his famous Edwards' Dodo painting from 1626, a rail-like bird is seen swallowing a frog behind the dodo, but Hume has doubted this identification and that of red rails in other Savery paintings, suggesting may instead show Eurasian bitterns. In 1977, the American ornithologist Sidney Dillon Ripley noted a bird resembling a red rail figured in the Italian artist Jacopo Bassano's painting Arca di Noè ("Noah's Ark") from ca. 1570. Cheke pointed out that it is doubtful that a Mauritian bird could have reached Italy this early, but the attribution may be inaccurate, as Bassano had four artist sons who used the same name. A similar bird is also seen in the Flemish artist Jan Brueghel the Elder's Noah's Ark painting. Hume concluded that these paintings also show Eurasian bitterns rather than red rails.

== Behaviour and ecology ==
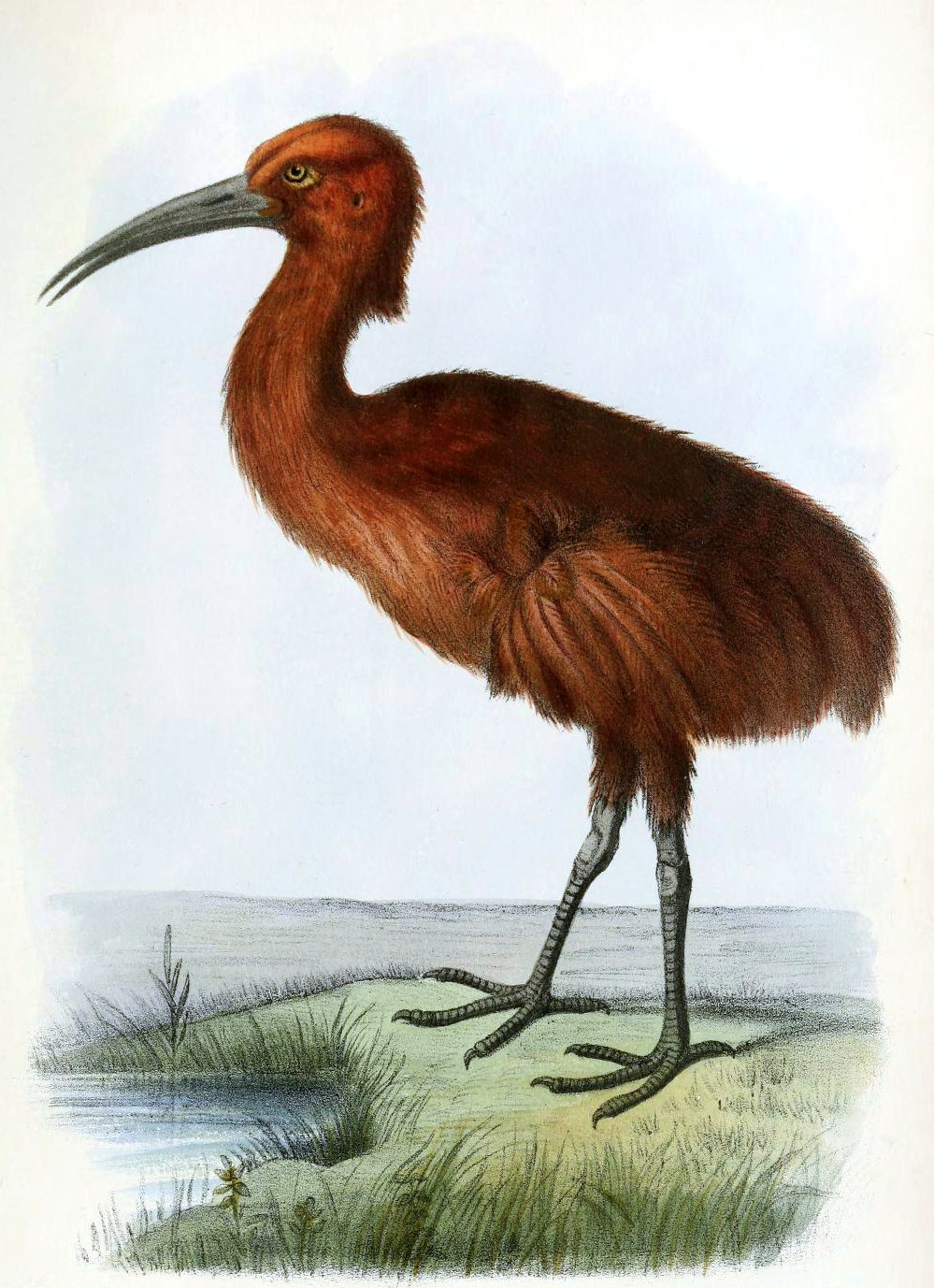
1869 adaptation of the Hoefnagel painting

Contemporary accounts are repetitive and do not shed much light on the life history of the red rail. Based on fossil localities, the bird widely occurred on Mauritius, in montane, lowland, and coastal habitats. The shape of the beak indicates it could have captured reptiles and invertebrates, and the differences in bill length suggests the sexes foraged on items of different sizes. It may also have scavenged breeding colonies of birds and nesting-sites of tortoises, as the Rodrigues rail did. No contemporary accounts were known to mention the red rail's diet, until the 1660s report of Johannes Pretorius about his stay on Mauritius was published in 2015, where he mentioned that the bird "scratches in the earth with its sharp claws like a fowl to find food such as worms under the fallen leaves."

Milne-Edwards suggested that since the tip of the red rail's bill was sharp and strong, it fed by crushing molluscs and other shells, like oystercatchers do. There were many endemic land-snails on Mauritius, including the large, extinct Tropidophora carinata, and subfossil shells have been found with puncture holes on their lower surfaces, which suggest predation by birds, probably matching attacks from the beak of the red rail. The similarly sized weka of New Zealand punctures shells of land-snails to extract meat, but can also swallow Powelliphanta snails; Hume suggested the red rail was also able to swallow snails whole. Since Pretorius mentioned the red rail searched for worms in leaf-litter, Hume suggested this could refer to nemertean and planarian worms; Mauritius has endemic species of these groups which live in leaf-litter and rotten wood. He could also have referred to the now extinct worm-snake Madatyphlops cariei, which was up to 200 mm (7.9 in) long, and probably lived in leaf-litter like its relatives do.

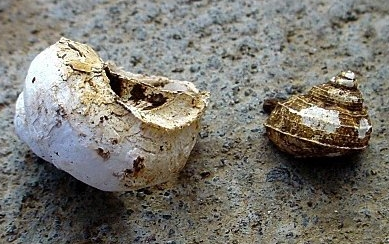
Shells of the extinct land-snail Tropidophora carinata have been found with puncture holes possibly made by feeding red rails

Hume noted that the front of the red rail's jaws were pitted with numerous foramina, running from the nasal aperture to almost the tip of the premaxilla. These were mostly oval, varying in depth and inclination, and became shallower hindward from the tip. Similar foramina can be seen in probing birds, such as kiwis, ibises, and sandpipers. While unrelated, these three bird groups share a foraging strategy; they probe for live food beneath substrate, and have elongated bills with clusters of mechanoreceptors concentrated at the tip. Their bill-tips allow them to detect buried prey by sensing cues from the substrate. The foramina on the bill of the red rail were comparable to those in other probing rails with long bills (such as the extinct snipe-rail), though not as concentrated on the tip, and the front end of the bill's curvature also began at the front of the nasal opening (as well as the same point in the mandible). The bill's tip was thereby both strong and very sensitive, and a useful tool for probing for invertebrates.

A 1631 letter probably by the Dutch lawyer Leonardus Wallesius (long thought lost, but rediscovered in 2017) uses word-play to refer to the animals described, with red rails supposedly being an allegory for soldiers:

The soldiers were very small and moved slowly, so that we could catch them easily with our hands. Their armor was their mouth, which was very sharp and pointed; they used it instead of a dagger, were very cowardly and nervous; they did not behave as soldiers at all, and walked in a disorderly manner, one here, the other there, and did not show any faithfulness towards one another.

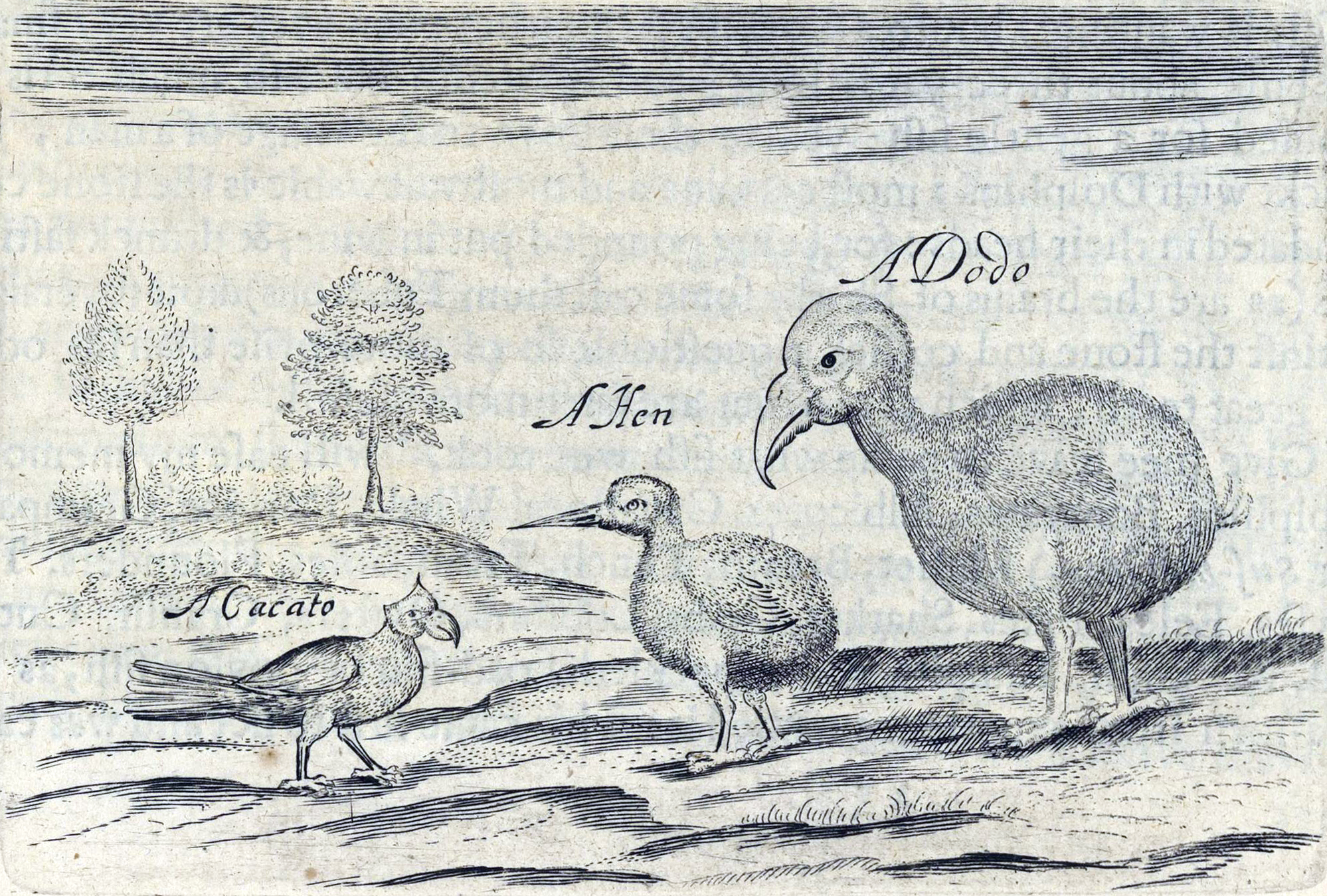
Labeled sketch from 1634 by Sir Thomas Herbert, showing a broad-billed parrot, a red rail, and a dodo

While it was swift and could escape when chased, it was easily lured by waving a red cloth, which they approached to attack; a similar behaviour was noted in its relative, the Rodrigues rail. The birds could then be picked up, and their cries when held would draw more individuals to the scene, as the birds, which had evolved in the absence of mammalian predators, were curious and not afraid of humans. Herbert described its behaviour towards red cloth in 1634:

The hens in eating taste like parched pigs, if you see a flocke of twelve or twenties, shew them a red cloth, and with their utmost silly fury they will altogether flie upon it, and if you strike downe one, the rest are as good as caught, not budging an iot till they be all destroyed.

Many other endemic species of Mauritius became extinct after the arrival of humans to the island heavily damaged the ecosystem, making it hard to reconstruct. Before humans arrived, Mauritius was entirely covered in forests, but very little remains today due to deforestation. The surviving endemic fauna is still seriously threatened. The red rail lived alongside other recently extinct Mauritian birds such as the dodo, the broad-billed parrot, the Mascarene grey parakeet, the Mauritius blue pigeon, the Mauritius scops owl, the Mascarene coot, the Mauritian shelduck, the Mauritian duck, and the Mauritius night heron. Extinct Mauritian reptiles include the saddle-backed Mauritius giant tortoise, the domed Mauritius giant tortoise, the Mauritian giant skink, and the Round Island burrowing boa. The small Mauritian flying fox and the snail Tropidophora carinata lived on Mauritius and Réunion, but became extinct in both islands. Some plants, such as Casearia tinifolia and the palm orchid, have also become extinct.

== Relationship with humans ==
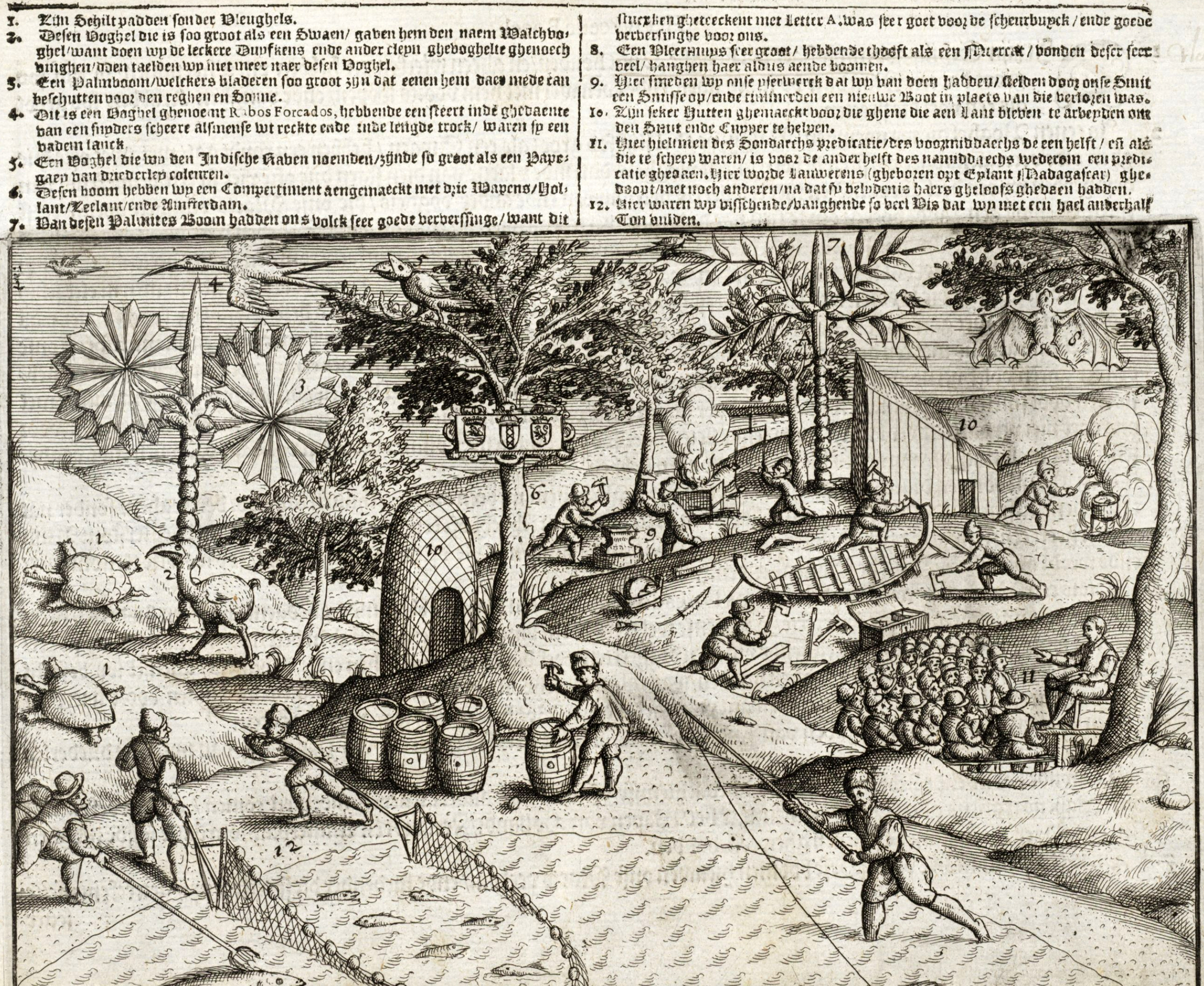
Depiction of Dutch activities on Mauritius in 1598, with various birds

To the sailors who visited Mauritius from 1598 and onwards, the fauna was mainly interesting from a culinary standpoint. The dodo was sometimes considered rather unpalatable, but the red rail was a popular gamebird for the Dutch and French settlers. The reports dwell upon the varying ease with which the bird could be caught according to the hunting method and the fact that when roasted it was considered similar to pork. The last detailed account of the red rail was by the German pastor Johann Christian Hoffmann, on Mauritius in the early 1670s, who described a hunt as follows:

... [there is also] a particular sort of bird known as toddaerschen which is the size of an ordinary hen. [To catch them] you take a small stick in the right hand and wrap the left hand in a red rag, showing this to the birds, which are generally in big flocks; these stupid animals precipitate themselves almost without hesitation on the rag. I cannot truly say whether it is through hate or love of this colour. Once they are close enough, you can hit them with the stick, and then have only to pick them up. Once you have taken one and are holding it in your hand, all the others come running up as it [sic] to its aid and can be offered the same fate.

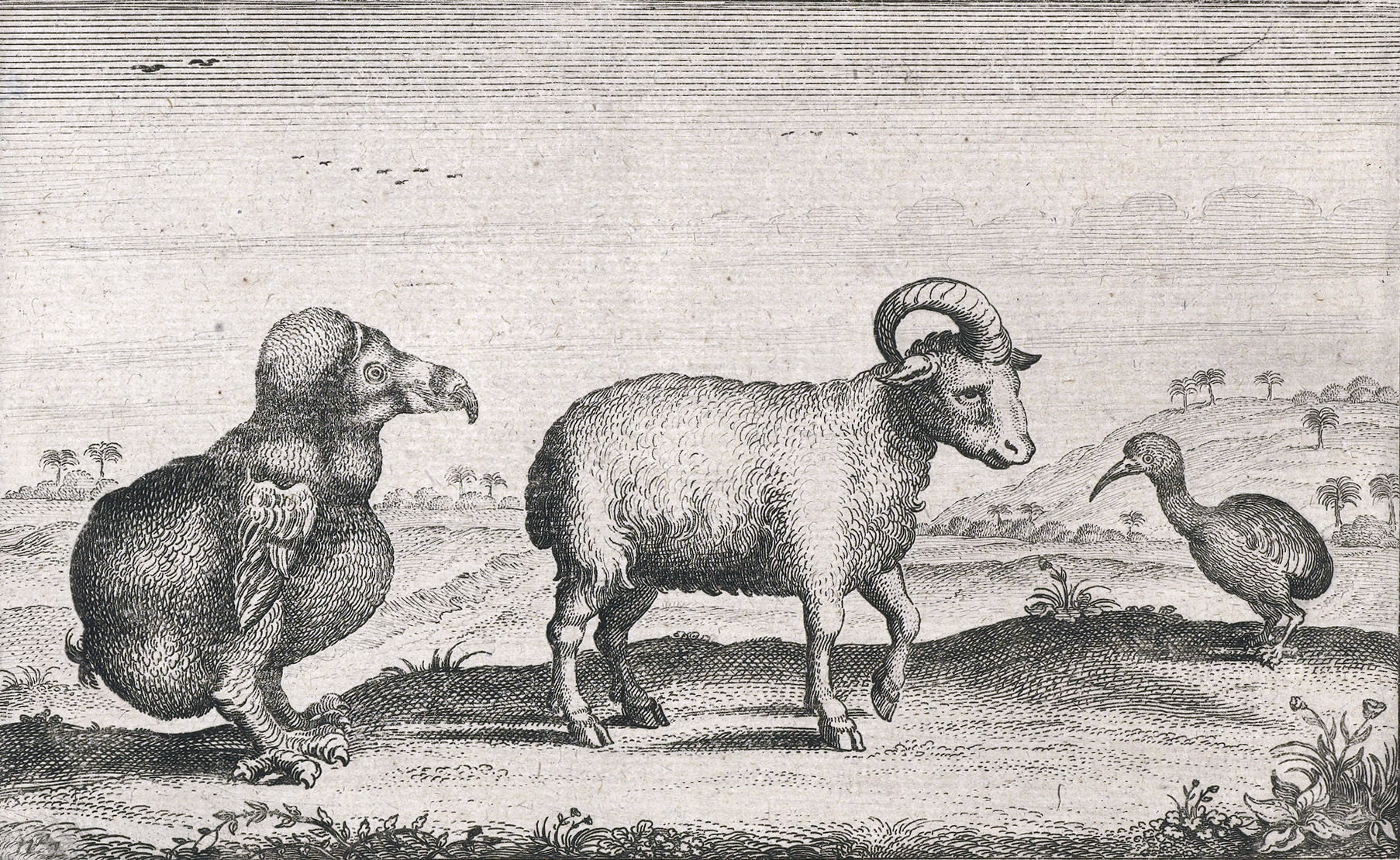
Pieter van den Broecke's 1617 drawing of a dodo, a one-horned goat, and a red rail; after the dodo became extinct, its name may have been transferred to the red rail

Hoffman's account refers to the red rail by the German version of the Dutch name originally applied to the dodo, "dod-aers", and John Marshall used "red hen" interchangeably with "dodo" in 1668. Milne-Edwards suggested that early travellers may have confused young dodos with red rails. The British ornithologist Alfred Newton (brother of Edward) suggested in 1868 that the name of the dodo was transferred to the red rail after the former had gone extinct. Cheke suggested in 2008 that all post 1662 references to "dodos" therefore refer to the rail instead. A 1681 account of a "dodo", previously thought to have been the last, mentioned that the meat was "hard", similar to the description of red hen meat. The British writer Errol Fuller has also cast the 1662 "dodo" sighting in doubt, as the reaction to distress cries of the birds mentioned matches what was described for the red rail.

In 2020, Cheke and the British researcher Jolyon C. Parish suggested that all mentions of dodos after the mid-17th century instead referred to red rails, and that the dodo had disappeared due to predation by feral pigs during a hiatus in settlement of Mauritius (1658–1664). The dodo's extinction therefore was not realised at the time, since new settlers had not seen real dodos, but as they expected to see flightless birds, they referred to the red rail by that name instead. Since red rails probably had larger clutches than dodos (as in other rails) and their eggs could be incubated faster, and their nests were perhaps concealed like those of the Rodrigues rail, they probably bred more efficiently, and were less vulnerable to pigs. They may also have foraged from the digging, scraping and rooting of the pigs, as does the weka.

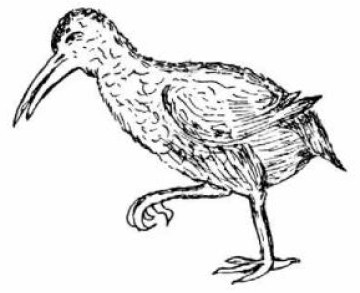
Drawing by Peter Mundy, 1638

In 1638, 230 years before Charles Darwin's theory of evolution, the appearance of the red rail and the dodo led Mundy to speculate:

Of these 2 sorts off fowl afforementionede, For oughtt wee yett know, Not any to bee Found out of this Iland, which lyeth aboutt 100 leagues From St. Lawrence. A question may bee demaunded how they should bee here and Not elcewhere, beeing soe Farer From other land and can Neither fly or swymme; whither by Mixture off kindes producing straunge and Monstrous formes, or the Nature of the Climate, ayer and earth in alltring the First shapes in long tyme, or how.

In the preface of his 1873 travelogue Sub-Tropical Rambles in the Land of the Aphanapteryx, the US consul to Mauritius Nicolas Pike wrote the following about its title:

Everybody has heard all about the Dodo, once existent in Mauritius, but many are not aware of the very beautiful bird the Aphanapteryx imperialis, coexistent with it, a sketch of which is on the title-page, and whose exquisite red silky plumage might vie with the handsomest birds of the present era.

=== Extinction ===
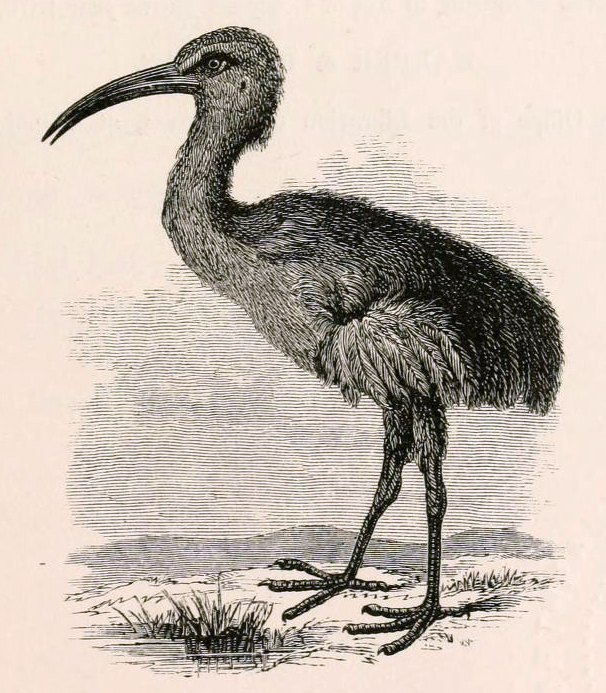
Title-page illustration of the 1873 travelogue Sub-Tropical Rambles in the Land of the Aphanapteryx by Nicolas Pike

Many terrestrial rails are flightless, and island populations are particularly vulnerable to anthropogenic (human-caused) changes; as a result, rails have suffered more extinctions than any other family of birds. All six endemic species of Mascarene rails are extinct, all caused by human activities. In addition to hunting pressure by humans, the fact that the red rail nested on the ground made it vulnerable to pigs and other introduced animals, which ate their eggs and young, probably contributing to its extinction, according to Cheke. Hume pointed out that the red rail had coexisted with introduced rats since at least the 14th century, which did not appear to have affected them (as they seem to have been relatively common in the 1680s), and they were probably able to defend their nests (Dryolimnas rails have been observed killing rats, for example). They also seemed to have managed to survive alongside humans as well as introduced pigs and crab-eating macaques.

Since the red rail was referred to by the names of the dodo in the late 1600s, it is uncertain which is the latest account of the latter. When the French traveller François Leguat, who had become familiar with the Rodrigues rail in the preceding years, arrived on Mauritius in 1693, he remarked that the red rail had become rare. He was the last source to mention the bird, so it is assumed that it became extinct around 1700. Feral cats, which are effective predators of ground-inhabiting birds, were established on Mauritius around the late 1680s (to control rats), and this has been cause for rapid disappearance of rails elsewhere, for example on Aldabra Atoll. Being inquisitive and fearless, Hume suggested the red rail would have been easy prey for cats, and was thereby driven to extinction.

== See also ==
- Holocene extinction
- List of extinct birds
