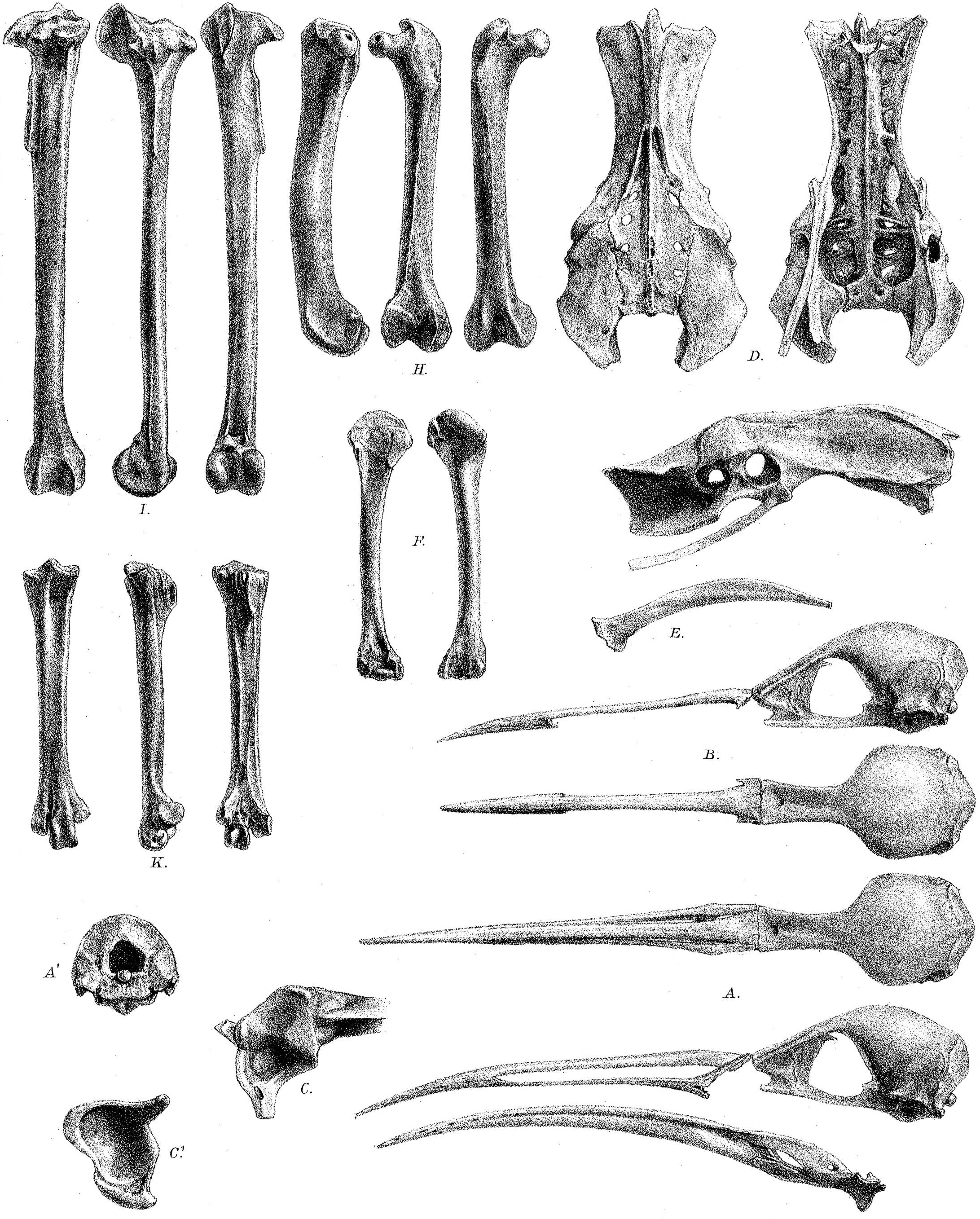
- Subfossil bones described in 1879, including two skulls, a pelvis, and limb bones

Conservation status
- Extinct (mid-18th century) (IUCN 3.1)

Scientific classification
- Kingdom: Animalia
- Phylum: Chordata
- Class: Aves
- Order: Gruiformes
- Family: Rallidae
- Genus: †Erythromachus; Milne-Edwards, 1874
- Species: †E. leguati

Binomial name
- †Erythromachus leguati Milne-Edwards, 1874
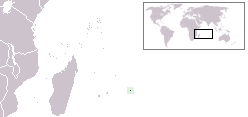
- Location of Rodrigues

Synonyms
- List: Aphanapteryx leguati Günther & Newton, 1879; Miserythrus leguati Newton, 1874; Erythromachus leguata Fürbringer, 1888 (lapsus); Aphanopteryx leguati Rothschild, 1907 (lapsus); Myserythrus leguati Hachisuka, 1953 (lapsus); Erthyromachus leguati Brodkorb, 1967 (lapsus)

= Rodrigues rail =

Extinct bird of the rail family that was endemic to Rodrigues

The Rodrigues rail (Erythromachus leguati), also known as Leguat's gelinote or Leguat's rail, is an extinct species of the rail family that was endemic to the Mascarene island of Rodrigues. The bird was first documented from life by two accounts from 1691–93 and 1725–26. Subfossil remains were later discovered and correlated with the old accounts in 1874, and the species was named E. leguati in Leguat's honour. It is generally kept in its own genus, Erythromachus, but has sometimes been assigned to the genus Aphanapteryx along with its close relative the red rail (A. bonasia) of Mauritius; their relationship with other rails is unclear.

The Rodrigues rail was about 35 cm (14 in) long and weighed at least 500 g (18 oz). It was described as having grey plumage, a red beak, red legs, and a naked red patch around the eye. The beak was long and curved downwards. It was flightless and fed on tortoise eggs. It was described as being attracted to red objects, which humans exploited while hunting it. The Rodrigues rail is believed to have become extinct in the mid-18th century mainly because of predation by introduced cats and hunting.

== Taxonomy ==
In 1848, the English zoologist Hugh Edwin Strickland called attention to a bird mentioned in the French traveller François Leguat's 1708 memoir A New Voyage to the East Indies about his stay on the Mascarene island of Rodrigues from 1691–93. Leguat was the leader of a group of nine French Huguenot refugees who settled on Rodrigues after they were marooned there. Leguat referred to the birds as "gelinottes" (translated as "wood-hens"), a name Strickland thought implied the grouse of Europe, though this was not consistent with the form of the beak described by Leguat. Strickland was unable to classify the bird further, but noted similarities with the dodo and kiwi, based on unidentified birds from Mauritius illustrated by the travellers Pieter van den Broecke and Sir Thomas Herbert, which he thought related. Strickland also noted similarities with a bird from Mauritius, which would later be identified as the red rail (Aphanapteryx bonasia).

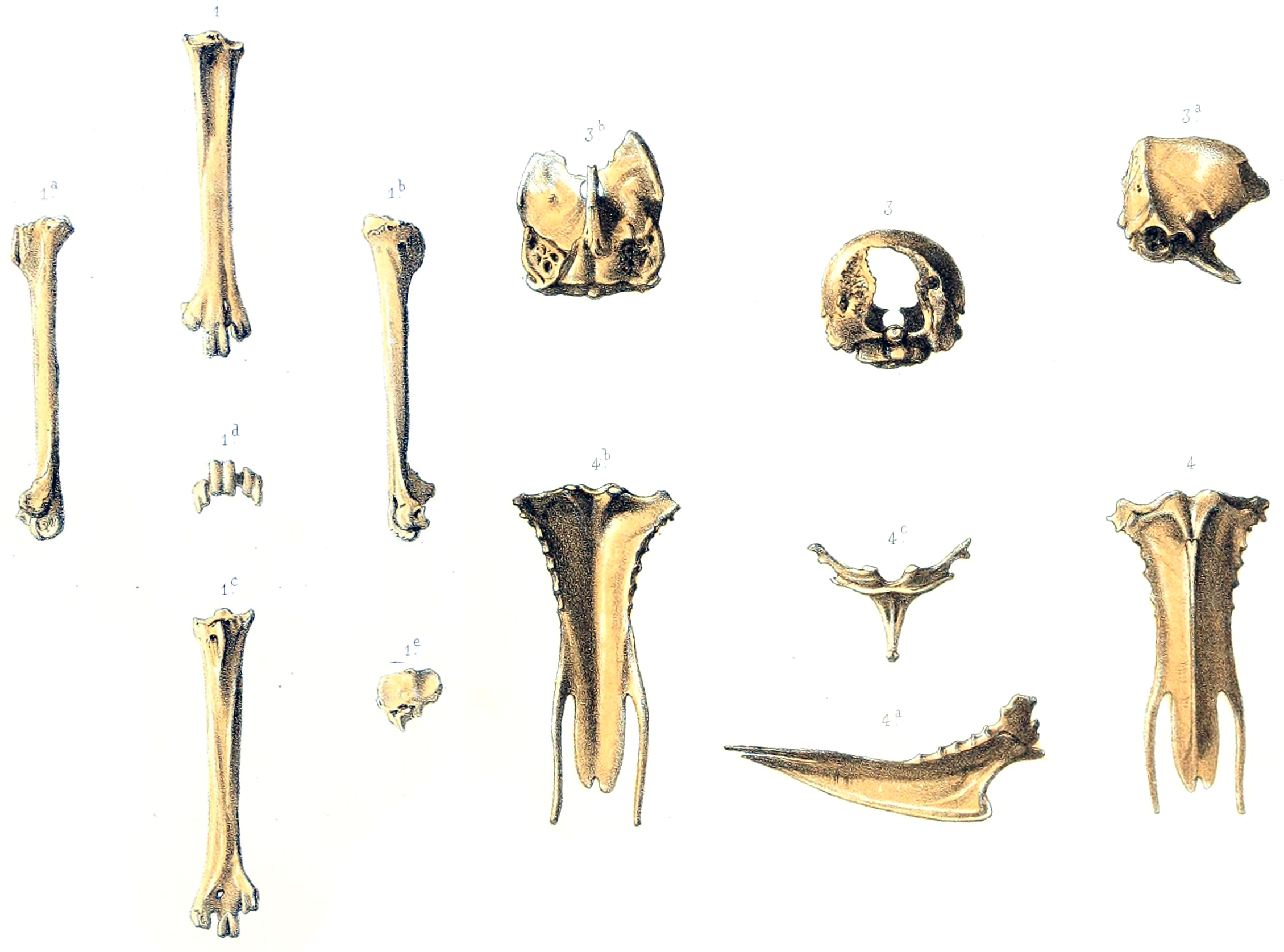
First bones described in 1874; a tarsometatarsus (1.–1e.), a fragmentary skull (3.–3b., and a sternum (4.–4c.)

In 1874, the French zoologist Alphonse Milne-Edwards described subfossil bird bones from Rodrigues he had received via the British ornithologist Alfred Newton, which had been excavated under the supervision of his brother, Colonial Secretary Edward Newton. Milne-Edwards connected Leguat's account with three bones (a sternum, a tarsometatarsus, and a fragmentary skull) found in caves of the Plaine Corail region, Rodrigues. He recognised their similarity to those of the red rail, while noting it supposedly had a straighter beak (as described by Leguat). Milne-Edwards coined the generic name Erythromachus from the Greek words eruthros, "red", and makhç, "battle" (also translated as "hostile to red"), in reference to its attraction to red objects, and the specific name is in honour of Leguat.

The name Erythromachus was incorrectly explained as referring to the Erythraean sea by the American ornithologist Charles Wallace Richmond in 1908. The name Miserythrus, from "red" and "hatred", was used by A. Newton in 1874 (originally only in a manuscript), and also refers to the rail's behaviour towards red, but as a newer name, it is a junior synonym. Milne-Edwards did not select a holotype specimen for the species from the bones he had loaned from Cambridge University Museum of Zoology for his study, but a syntype series was later listed from specimens there, presumably by A. Newton.

In 1875, A. Newton also identified a reference to the bird in the 1725–26 account of the French traveller Julien Tafforet, Relation de l'Ile Rodrigue, which had recently been rediscovered. In 1879, more fossils, including skulls, were described by the zoologists Albert Günther and E. Newton, who confirmed that the bird was a rail, and also noted that some specimens had beaks as curved as that of the red rail. In 1921, the American linguist Geoffroy Atkinson questioned the bird's existence, in an article that doubted the veracity of Leguat's memoir. The American ornithologist James Greenway suggested in 1967 that Leguat's description referred to wind-blown purple swamphens, since the word grey is sometimes used synonymously with blue in old descriptions. This idea has not been accepted by other commentators. Today, it is widely accepted that Leguat's memoirs represent credible observations of local birds in life. His observations on the local fauna are considered some of the first cohesive accounts of animal behaviour in the wild.

In 1999, the French palaeontologist Cécile Mourer-Chauviré and colleagues pointed out that a carpometacarpus bone assigned to the Rodrigues rail and illustrated by Günther and E. Newton in 1879 does not belong to a rail, and therefore not this bird. More subfossils have since been discovered, including an associated but incomplete skeleton with a complete skull and jaws found in Caverne Poule Rouge in 2005.

=== Evolution ===
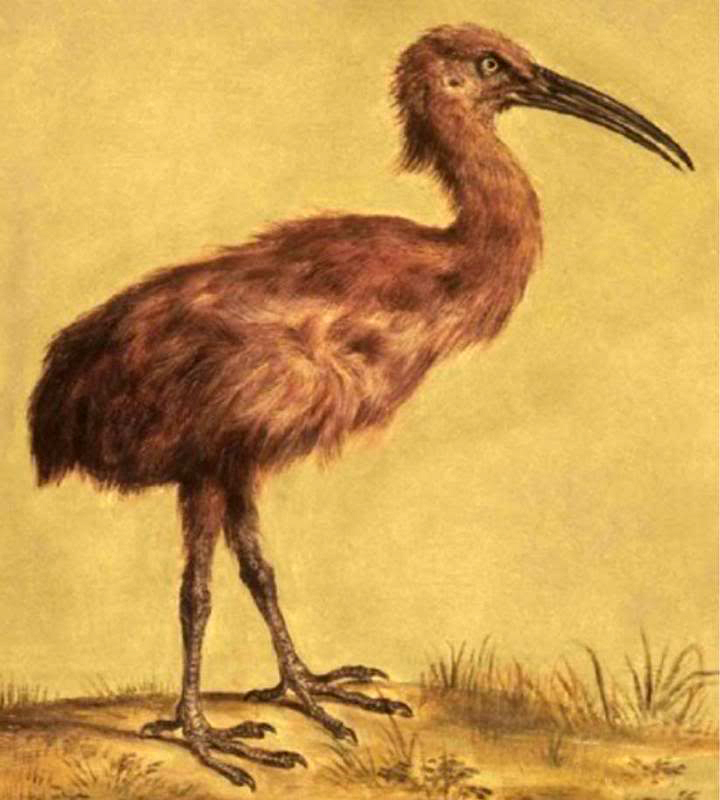
Painting of the similar red rail, by Hoefnagel, ca. 1610

Apart from being a close relative to the red rail, the relationships of the Rodrigues rail are uncertain and the two are commonly listed as separate genera, Aphanapteryx and Erythromachus, but have sometimes been united as species of Aphanapteryx. Günther and E. Newton first generically synonymised the two in 1879 because of their skeletal similarities. In 1945, the French palaeontologist Jean Piveteau found skull features of the two species different enough for generic separation, and in 1977, the American ornithologist Storrs L. Olson stated that though the two species were similar and derived from the same stock, they had also diverged considerably, and should possibly be kept separate. Based on geographic location and the morphology of the nasal bones, Olson suggested that they were related to the genera Gallirallus, Dryolimnas, Atlantisia, and Rallus. The American ornithologist Bradley C. Livezey was unable to determine the affinities of the Rodrigues and red rail in 1998, stating that some of the features uniting them and some other rails were associated with the loss of flight rather than common descent. He also suggested that the grouping of the Rodrigues and red rail into the same genus may have been influenced by their geographical distribution. Mourer-Chauviré and colleagues also considered the two as belonging to separate genera.

Rails have reached many oceanic archipelagos, which has frequently led to speciation and evolution of flightlessness. According to the British researchers Anthony S. Cheke and Julian P. Hume in 2008, the fact that the red rail lost much of its feather structure indicates it was isolated for a long time. These rails may be of Asian origin, like many other Mascarene birds. In 2019, Hume supported the distinction of the two genera, and cited the relation between the extinct Mauritius scops owl and the Rodrigues scops owl as another example of the diverging evolutionary paths on these islands. He stated that the relationships of the Rodrigues and red rails was more unclear than that of other extinct Mascarene rails, with many of their distinct features being related to flightlessness and modifications to their jaws due to their diet, suggesting a long period of isolation. He suggested their ancestors could have arrived on the Mascarenes during the middle Miocene at the earliest, but it may have happened more recently. The speed with which these features evolved may also have been affected by gene flow, resource availability, and climate events. Flightlessness can evolve rapidly in rails, sometimes repeatedly within the same groups, as in Dryolimnas, so the distinctness of the Rodrigues and red rails may not have taken long to evolve; some other specialised rails evolved in less than 1–3 million years. Hume suggested that the two rails were probably related to Dryolimnas, but their considerably different morphology made it difficult to establish how. In general, rails are adept at colonising islands, and can become flightless within a few generations in environments without predators, yet this also makes them vulnerable to human activities.

== Description ==
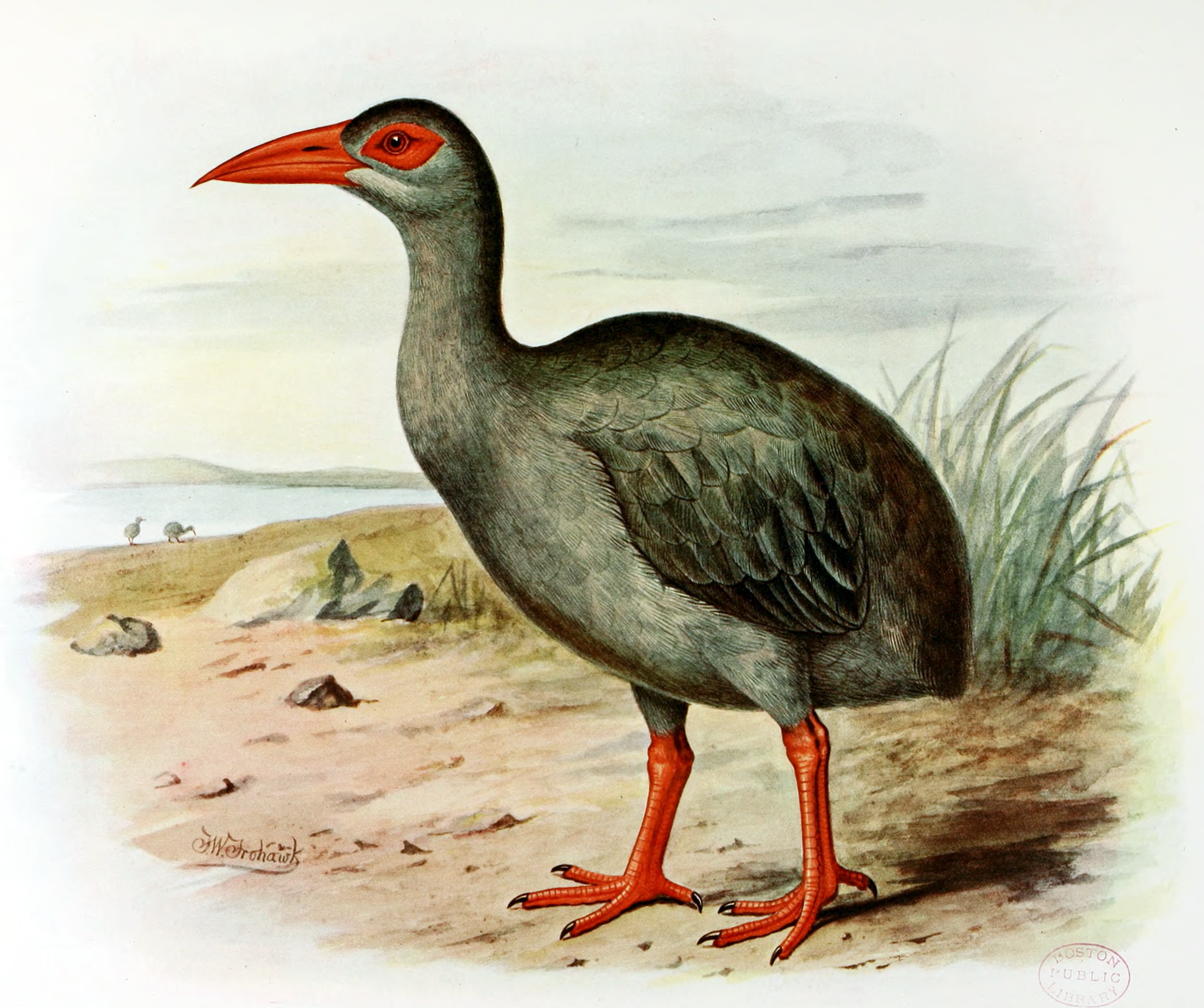
Frohawk's 1907 restoration, based on an old outline illustration and a description. Olson considered the image "rather fanciful"

The Rodrigues rail was about 35 cm (14 in) long, smaller than the red rail, but with proportionally longer wings. It may have weighed at least 500 g (18 oz). Subfossil remains exhibit a large variation in size, which may reflect sexual dimorphism. It had bright grey plumage, perhaps flecked with white. Its beak and legs were red, and it had a red, naked area (or wattle) around its eyes. The cranium of the Rodrigues rail was slightly elongated, convex in every direction, and compressed from top to bottom in side-view. The cranium was medium-sized among Mascarene rails, 38 mm (1.5 in) long and 20 mm (0.79 in) wide. It had a narrow, long frontal region, 6.5 mm (0.26 in) at its least width.

The beak was long and curved downwards as in the red rail, but the narial openings were longer. The premaxilla that comprised most of the upper bill was long, shallow in side-view, with a narrow nasal bone, and its total length was almost 60% longer than the cranium. The culmen of the beak was almost straight above the nostril, and the nasal bone was slightly longer than the cranium. The beak was up to 77 mm (3.0 in) long, the lower jaw up to 98 mm (3.9 in) long, and 8 mm (0.31 in) at its greatest depth. The narial (nostril) opening was very long, 66% of the rostrum's length. There were foramina (openings) on the upper bill, which did not extend to the front edge of the narial opening. The mandible was long and narrow, ending in a sharp point, with the length of the mandibular symphysis (the area where the halves of the mandible meet) being about 65% of the cranium's length. The mandible had large, deep set foramina, which ran almost up to a deep sulcus (furrow) at the centre of the mandible. Günther and Newton stated that the examined beaks varied greatly in size and shape; some specimens had short and almost straight beaks, while others had much longer beaks (up to one third longer) that were prominently curved. These writers were unsure whether this was related to the overall size of an individual bird or to sexual dimorphism. Livezy was unable to confirm the idea that the differences in the beaks reflected dimorphism in 2003, but thought it probable. Hume examined all available upper beaks in 2019, but found no differences in curvature.

The bones associated with the forelimbs were generally small in proportion to the bird. The scapula (shoulder blade) was small and narrow, and 45 mm (1.8 in) long. The coracoid was short but wide, and the sternum was also small. The humerus (upper arm bone) was very small, its shaft was curved from top to bottom, and it ranged from 45 to 50 mm (1.8 to 2.0 in). The radius and ulna (lower arm bones) were short, and the latter was and strongly arched from top to bottom, ranging from 37 to 42 mm (1.5 to 1.7 in). The pelvis was large and strongly built in proportion to the size of the bird, was 57 mm (2.2 in) long, 20 mm (0.79 in) wide at the front, and 36 mm (1.4 in) wide at the back. The hindlimb elements were generally very robust. The femur (thigh-bone) was very robust, with a curved shaft, and ranged from 56 to 63 mm (2.2 to 2.5 in) in length. The tibiotarsus (lower leg bone) was short but robust, and ranged from 84 to 101 mm (3.3 to 4.0 in). The fibula was also short and robust. The tarsometatarsus was short but very robust, ranging from 52 to 60 mm (2.0 to 2.4 in) long. The proportions of the legs, pelvis and sacrum of the Rodrigues and red rail were generally similar. The Rodrigues rail differed from the red rail by having a broader and shorter skull, longer and lower nostrils, a proportionately longer humerus, a shorter, stouter femur, as well as a considerably different plumage, based on early descriptions. The Dutch ornithologist Marc Herremans suggested in 1989 that the Rodrigues and red rails were neotenic, with juvenile features such as weak pectoral apparatuses and downy plumage.

=== Contemporary accounts ===
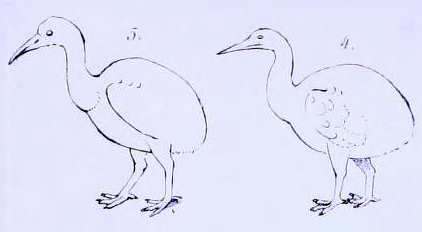
Schlegel's 1854 outlines of "dodo" species (the second supposedly from Rodrigues), which were actually red rails seen by travellers on Mauritius

The Rodrigues rail was first recorded by Leguat in his 1708 memoir, and his account of the bird reads as follows:

Our 'gelinotes' are fat all the year round and of a most delicate taste. Their colour is always of a bright grey, and there is very little difference in plumage between the two sexes. They hide their nests so well that we could not find them out, and consequently did not taste their eggs. They have a red naked area round their eyes, their beaks are straight and pointed, near two and two-fifths inches long, and red also. They cannot fly, their fat makes them too heavy for it. If you offer them anything red, they are so angry they will fly at you to catch it out of your hand, and in the heat of the combat we had an opportunity to take them with ease.

Tafforet's 25-1726 description of the bird's appearance and behaviour reads as follows:

There is another kind of bird, the size of a young hen, which has the beak and legs red. Its beak is roughly like that of a curlew, except that it is a little deeper and not quite so long. Its plumage is mottled with white and grey. They generally feed on the eggs of the land tortoises, which they take from the ground, and makes them so fat that they often have difficulty running. They are very good to eat, and their fat is of a yellowish-red, which is excellent for pains. They have small pinions [wings], without feathers, so they cannot fly; but on the contrary, they run very well. Their cry is a continual whistling. When they see somebody pursuing them they produce another sort of noise from their bodies, like that of a person who has hiccups and with the stomach tensed.

Unlike the red rail and many other extinct Mascarene birds, the Rodrigues rail was not illustrated by contemporaneous artists. Olson described reconstructions made for the British zoologist Walter Rothschild's 1907 book Extinct Birds and the Japanese ornithologist Masauji Hachisuka's 1953 book The Dodo and Kindred Birds as "rather fanciful". The English artist Frederick William Frohawk based his restoration in the former book on an outline illustration, which was in turn based on a sketch drawn by Herbert, which is now known to depict the red rail. The German zoologist Hermann Schlegel thought it depicted a species of dodo (which he called Didus herbertii) from Rodrigues when he drew the outline in 1854, and that it was the species mentioned by Leguat.

== Behaviour and ecology ==
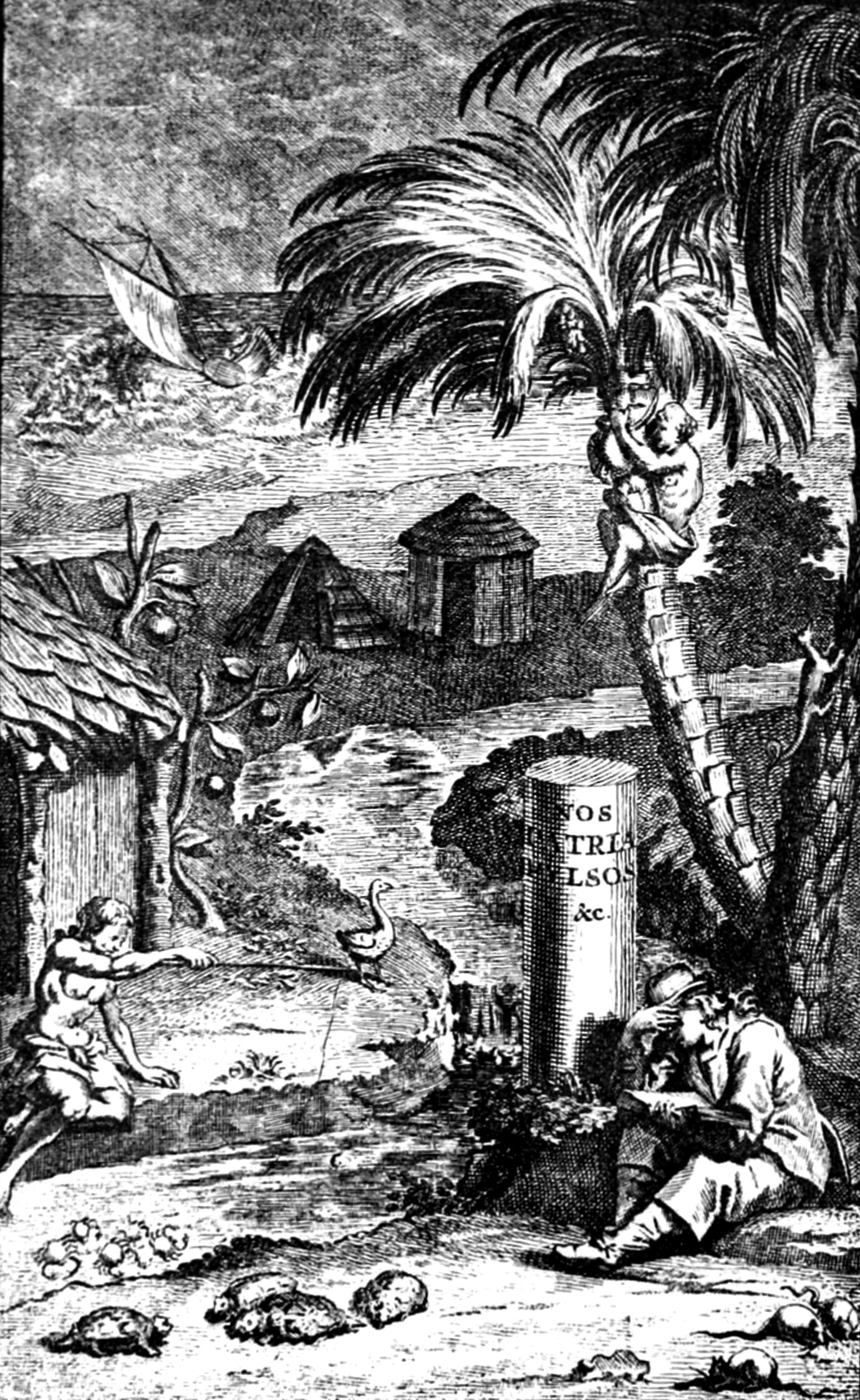
Frontispiece to Leguat's 1708 memoir, showing his settlement on Rodrigues, with tortoises and rats below

According to Tafforet's account, the Rodrigues rail fed on the eggs of the now extinct Cylindraspis tortoises, three species of which lived on Rodrigues. As it took advantage of their breeding season, Hume considered it an opportunistic predator, which perhaps also fed on hatchling tortoises. A former tortoise breeding area in the Plaine Corail shows that such sites were concentrated into a small area containing large numbers of eggs; the phalanx bone of a Rodrigues rail has been found among the egg remains. The rails would have fattened themselves seasonally, but at other times of the year, they probably fed on snails and other invertebrates, as well as scavenging sea bird colonies. The Rodrigues rail probably fed on worms, such as Kontikia whartoni and the now extinct Geonemertes rodericana, by probing leaf-litter or rotting wood. Sexual dimorphism may have reflected differences in diet between the sexes.

Since Leguat was unable to locate its nests, the Rodrigues rail may have nested outside the easily accessible open forest as was typical in coastal and lowland areas, and rather nested deep in forested valleys or mountainous hills of the interior, according to Hume. Its nests may have been well concealed in vegetation on the ground, as is the case of other flightless rails. Like the red rail, it was said to be attracted to the colour red, but the significance of this is unknown. This behaviour led Hume to call it an "aggressive species". According to Milne-Edwards, the bird had legs "made for running".

Many other species endemic to Rodrigues became extinct after humans arrived, and the island's ecosystem was heavily damaged. Before humans arrived, forests covered the island entirely, but very little of those remain today. The Rodrigues rail lived alongside other recently extinct birds, such as the Rodrigues solitaire, the Rodrigues parrot, Newton's parakeet, the Rodrigues starling, the Rodrigues scops owl, the Rodrigues night heron, and the Rodrigues pigeon. Extinct reptiles include the domed Rodrigues giant tortoise, the saddle-backed Rodrigues giant tortoise, and the Rodrigues day gecko.

== Extinction ==
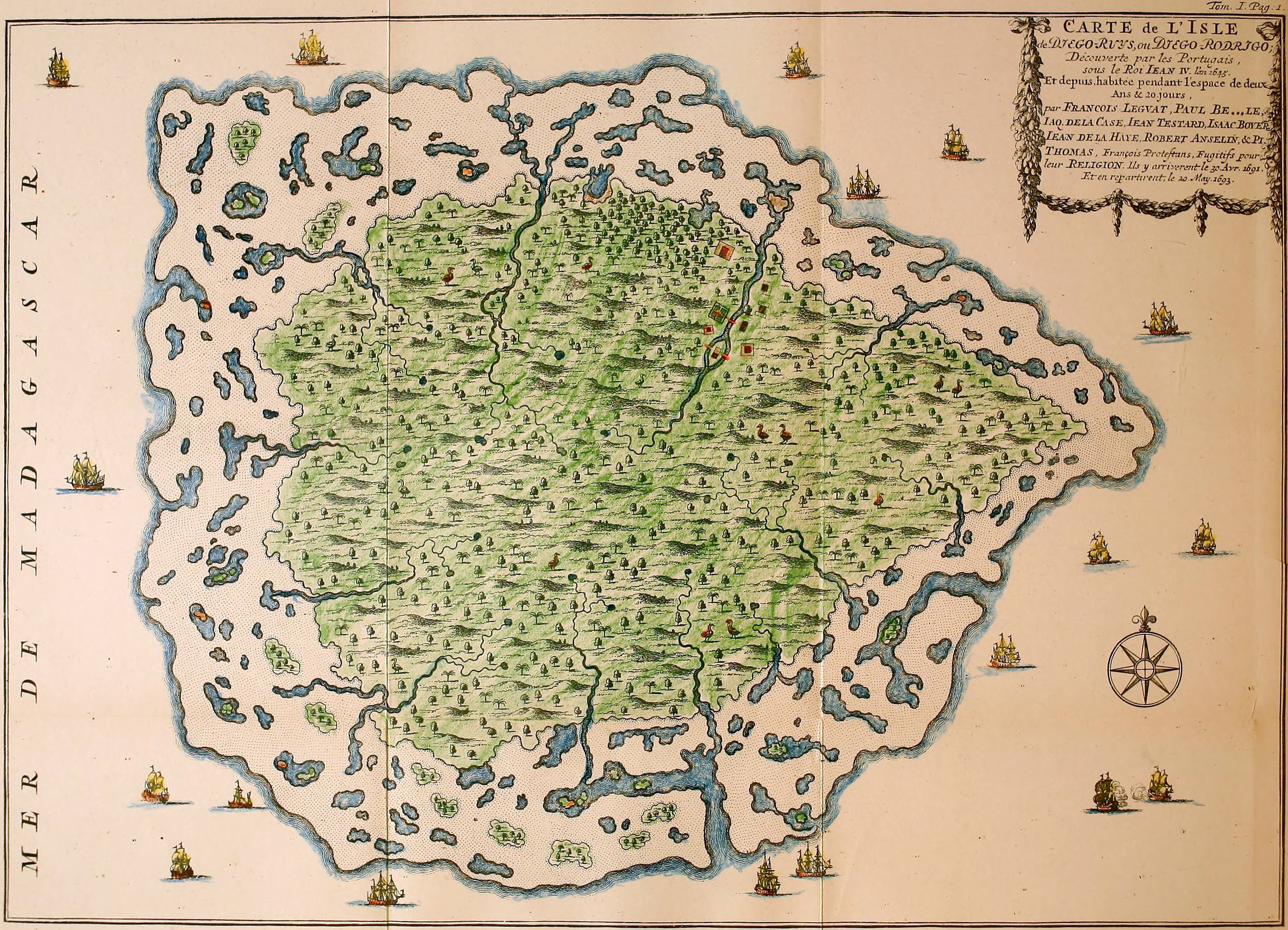
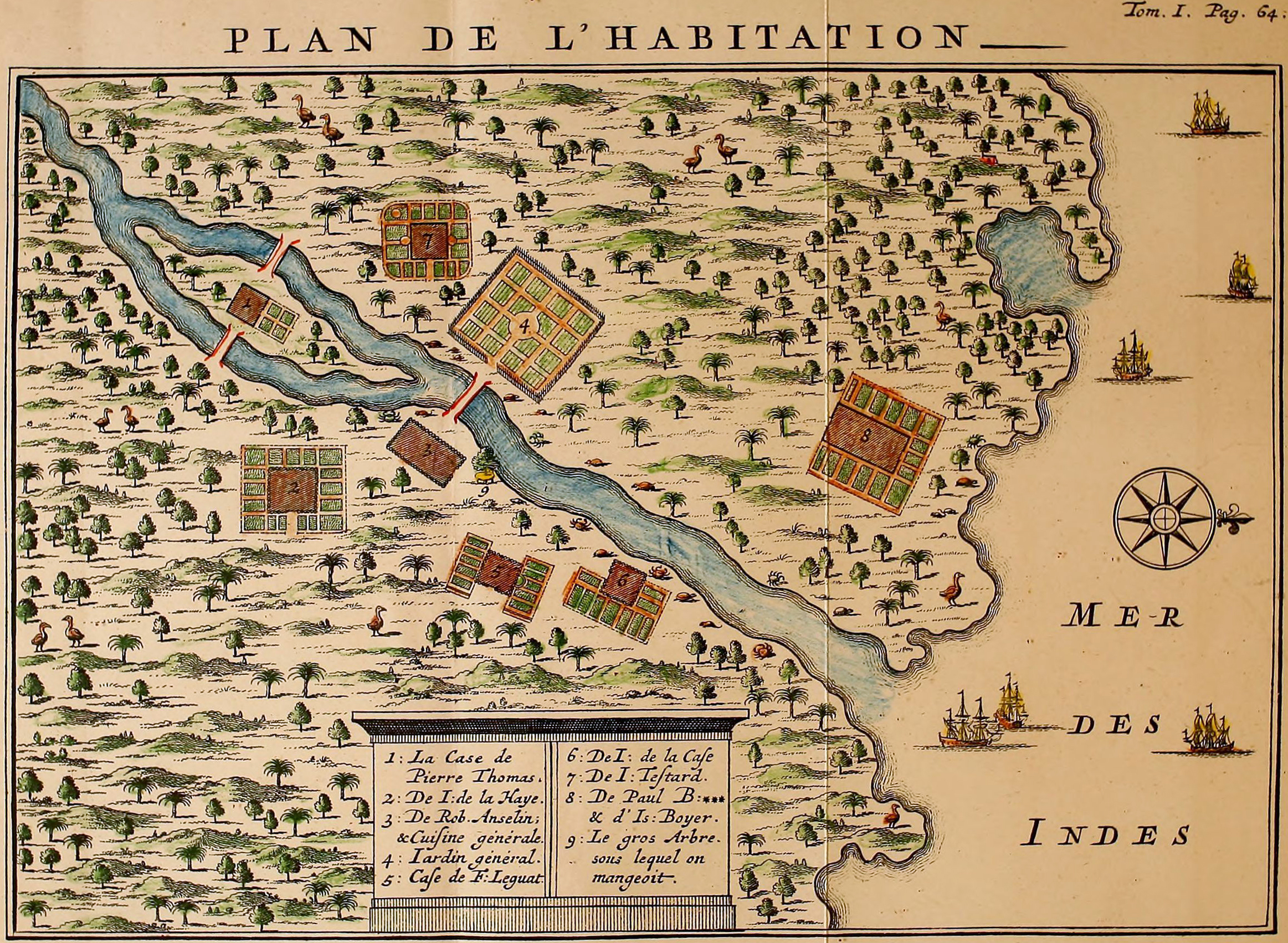
Leguat's 1708 maps of Rodrigues and his settlement.

Many terrestrial rails are flightless, and island populations are particularly vulnerable to man-made changes; as a result, rails have suffered more extinctions than any other family of birds. All six endemic species of Mascarene rails are extinct, caused by human activities. For at least a century the Rodrigues rail may have coexisted with rats, which were perhaps introduced by a group of sailors from a Dutch ship marooned there in 1644. Though rats were well established and numerous by the time Leguat and Tafforet stayed on the island, the rails also remained common, perhaps due to their aggressive nature.

In 1763, the French astronomer Alexandre Guy Pingré noted the absence of this and other birds on Rodrigues by the time of his visit to observe the 1761 transit of Venus:

I heard said of neither gélinottes [Rodrigues rail], nor butors [Rodrigues night heron], nor alouettes [small waders], nor bécassines [shearwaters or petrels]; there may have been some at the time of François Leguat, but they have either retreated from their homes or, more likely, the races no longer survive, since the island has been populated with cats.

The French began settling Rodrigues in 1735 (to supply Mauritius with tortoise meat), and Hume and the British ornithologist Michael Walters stated in 2012 that this must have taken a toll on the rails through hunting and deforestation, but their rapid disappearance was probably caused by cats introduced to control the rats around 1750, and the species may have gone extinct within a decade. Cheke responded in 2013 that there was no deforestation at the time, the species appears to have survived the rats, and that cats were the main culprits, assisted by hunting.
