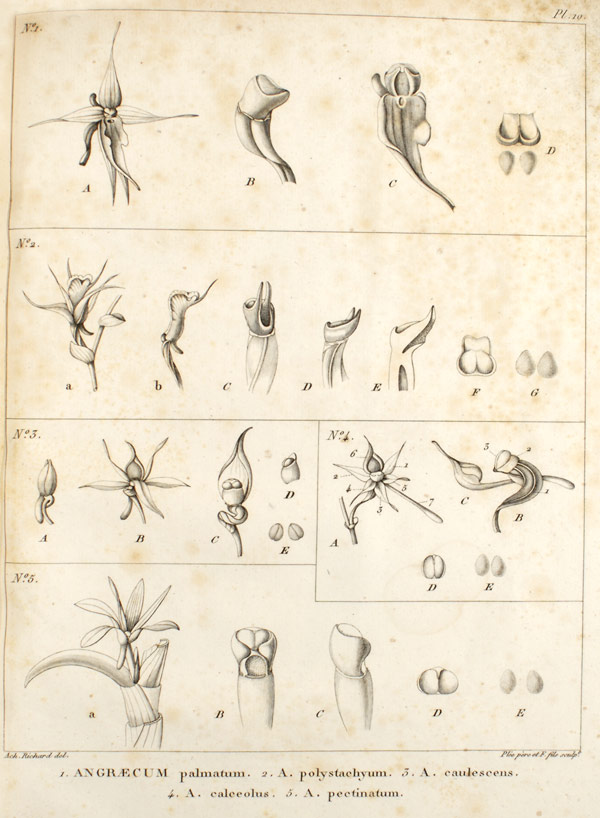

Scientific classification
- Kingdom: Plantae
- Clade: Tracheophytes
- Clade: Angiosperms
- Clade: Monocots
- Order: Asparagales
- Family: Orchidaceae
- Subfamily: Epidendroideae
- Genus: Angraecum
- Species: A. palmiforme

Binomial name
- Angraecum palmiforme Thouars

Synonyms
- Angraecum palmatum Thouars; Aerobion palmiforme (Thouars) Spreng.; Angorchis palmiformis (Thouars) Kuntze; Listrostachys palmiformis (Thouars) T. Durand & Schinz

= Angraecum palmiforme =

Species of orchid

Angraecum palmiforme is a species of orchid. It existed on Mauritius and Réunion, but possibly is extinct.
