= Jacob Hoefnagel =

Flemish artist, art dealer, diplomat, merchant and politician

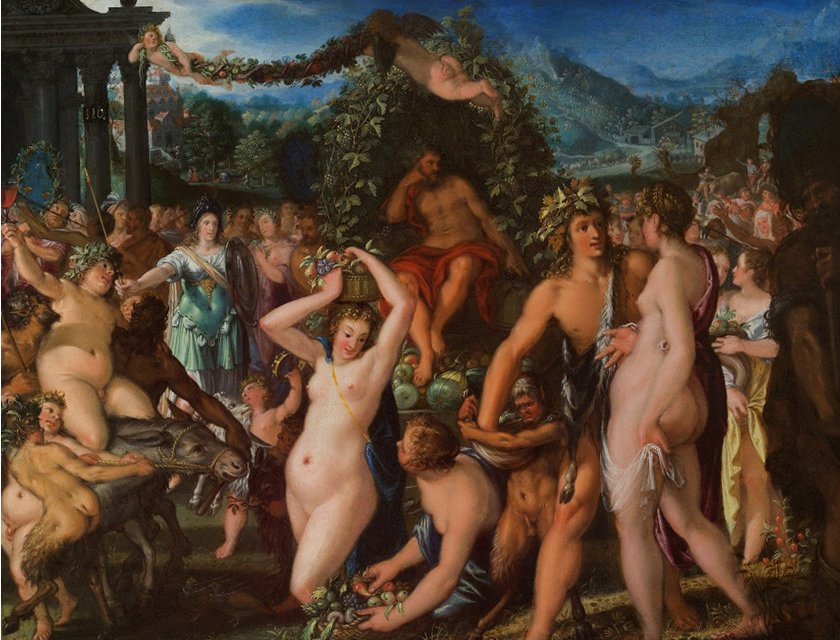
The Triumph of Autumn

Jacob Hoefnagel (also 'Jacobus', 'Jakob' or 'Jakub") (1573 in Antwerp – c.1632 in Hamburg), was a Flemish painter, printmaker, miniaturist, draftsman, art dealer, diplomat, merchant and politician. He was the son of the Flemish painter and miniaturist Joris Hoefnagel (1542–1601) who was a court painter to the dukes of Bavaria and Emperor Rudolf II in Prague. Jacob Hoefnagel himself became a court painter to Rudolf II and to the Swedish court. He is noted for his illustrations of natural history subjects as well as his portraits, topographical views, emblems and mythological works, which continue his father's style.

== Life ==
Jacob Hoefnagel was the oldest son of Susanna van Onsem and Joris Hoefnagel (1542–1600) and was baptized in Antwerp on 25 December 1573. His father was a member of a rich family of merchants in Antwerp who had left his home country after the 1576 Sack of Antwerp, in which much of the family fortune was lost to plunder. His father had been working in the family business but had also learned to paint and draw. During his exile his father was employed as a court painter successively by the dukes of Bavaria and Emperor Rudolf II in Prague. Unlike his father who was not trained professionally as an artist but had started out as a merchant in the family business in diamonds and luxury goods, Jacob was given the opportunity to study art under a master in Antwerp. He was registered as a pupil of Abraham Liesaert in the Antwerp Guild of Saint Luke in 1582. He then started a peripatetic life.

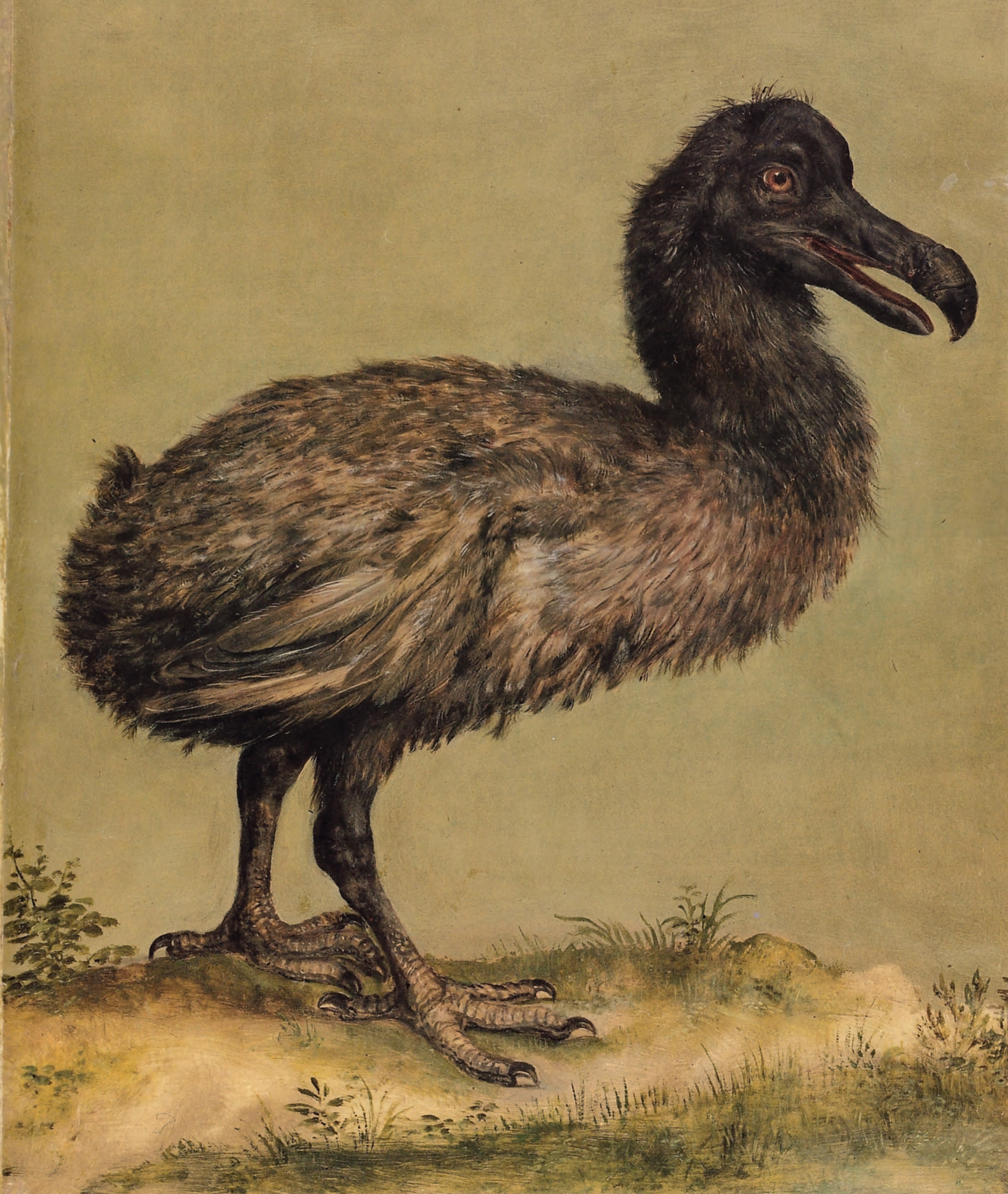
Dodo, possibly based on a stuffed dodo

He travelled via Munich to Frankfurt am Main where he joined his father at the latest in 1592. His father had by then remarried after the death of Jacob's mother. It was during this time that Jacob published a series of etchings copied from drawings by his father. It is likely he left Frankfurt in 1594 following the persecution of the Calvinists in that city. He must have visited war-torn Hungary in 1595, as he made two drawings of the city of Esztergom, which Karl von Mansfeld recaptured from the Ottomans that year. He was in Regensburg in 1594 and from 1600 in Prague. He was appointed the court painter to Rudolf II in Prague on 7 November 1602, a position he held until 1613. From 1602 he also spent time in Vienna where he married in 1605 Anna Muys, the daughter of the Dutch court architect Anthoni Muys (Anton de Mois). This was already his third marriage. Throughout his life Jacob Hoefnagel would marry five times. He was in Rome in 1605. He is recorded in Prague in 1609 and again in Rome in 1610.

A census in 1612 of people living at the court, conducted at the time Rudolf II died, includes the name of Jacob Hoefnagel, followed by the title 'Contrafetter' which means portrait painter. He experienced financial difficulties, which he attributed to the court's failure to pay his salary as a court painter. As a consequence he left the imperial service at the end of February 1612. Jacob Hoefnagel was later that year reported as living in Vienna. He returned to Prague by 1613. He was citizen of the Malá Strana in Prague between 1614 and 1617. In 1614 he married his fourth wife. In 1616, he finally received the overdue salary of five hundred thousand guilders which the imperial court owed him. Despite this payment he was experiencing financial difficulties in 1617. In Prague he belonged to a circle of Flemish and Dutch merchants, artists and scholars, some of whom were Reformed, with close ties to the court of Rudolf II. He was a diplomat at the court at a time when Prague played a pivotal role in European affairs.

During the Thirty Years' War which started in 1618, he took the side of the Protestant Winter King Frederick V of the Palatinate against the Catholic Habsburg dynasty. He was appointed as the official agent of the Bohemian estates to the Dutch Republic in 1618 and resided in the Dutch Republic from 1618 to 1620. He had the right contacts for the position as he was the nephew of the Dutch poet and politician Constantijn Huygens, who had married his aunt Susanna Hoefnagel. Huygens was secretary to the Dutch Stadtholder Maurice, Prince of Orange.

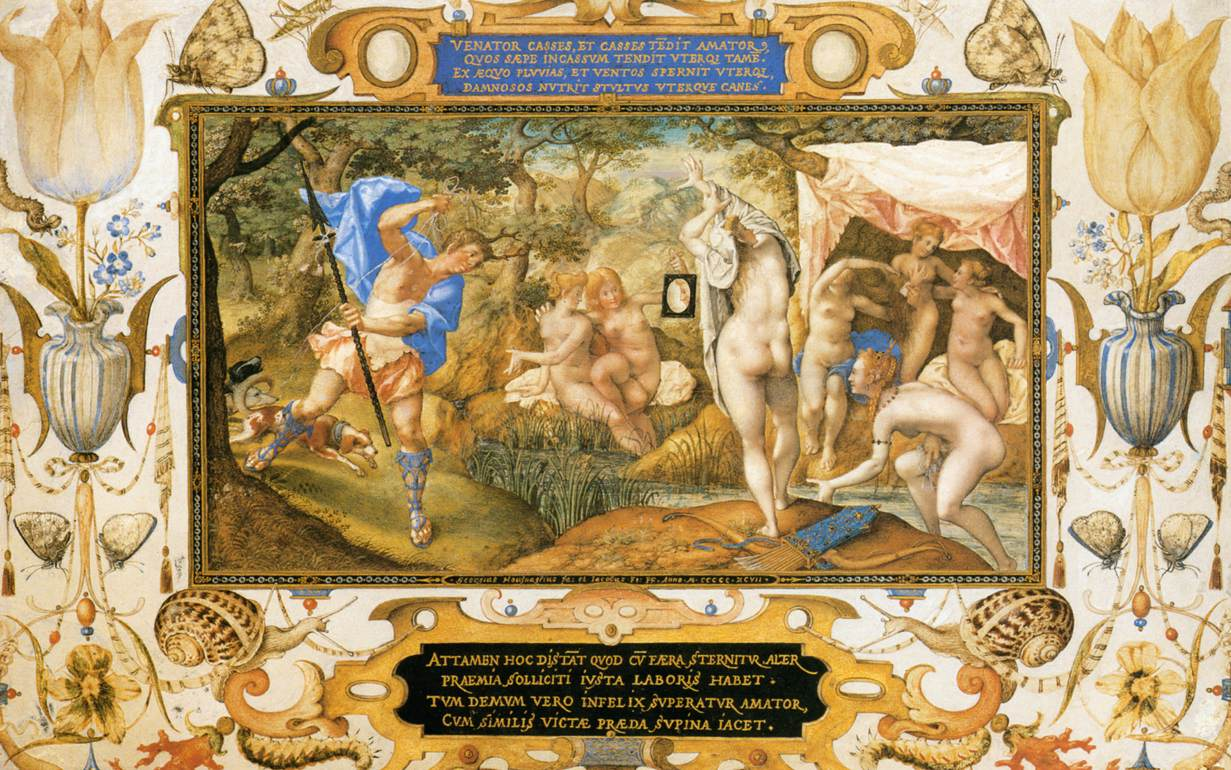
Diana and Actaeon, collaboration between Jacob and Joris Hoefnagel

In 1620 Hoefnagels was again a resident in Prague. He was accused by the authorities of fraudulently dealing with certain financial matter. Hoefnagel was convicted in absentia in a political process of embezzlement of funds. All his goods were confiscated and, according to some sources, he was sentenced to death. He could, however, flee.

He spent time in Scandinavia including Stockholm and Gothenburg. In Gothenburg, he holds various high level positions: from 1622 to 1626 he is city counselor, from 1624 to 1627 president of the court of justice and in July 1624 he was appointed as one of the three burgomasters. In 1624 the Swedish king Gustav Adolf visited Gothenburg. In November 1624, the painter is rewarded with a golden chain with a miniature portrait of the king. He is recorded on 30 April 1624 in the Swedish court accounts as a portrait painter. He was in Altona (Hamburg) in 1626 where he married for the fifth and last time. Details about his last years are not available. His wife is recorded as a widow in Hamburg in 1633.

== Work ==
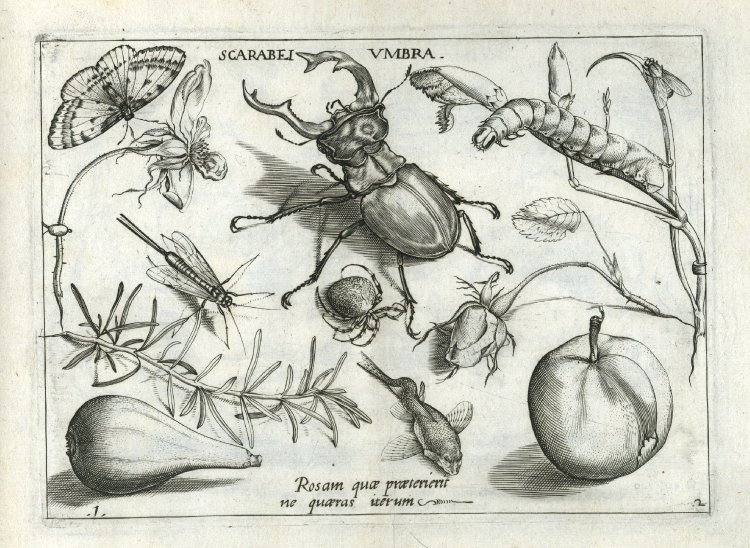
Arrangement of insects, arachnids, fruit, flowers etc, from the Archetypa studiaque

Jacob Hoefnagel worked in various media and formats and is known for portraits, still lifes, mythological, scientific and topographical works, miniatures and emblems executed in oil, water colour, gouache and as engravings.

=== Archetypa studiaque patris Georgii Hoefnagelii ===
His first important work was the Archetypa studiaque patris Georgii Hoefnagelii, which he published in 1592 in Frankfurt. The book is a collection of 48 engravings of plants, insects and small animals shown ad vivum. It is divided in four parts of twelve plates (each with separate frontispiece), made after designs by his father Joris Hoefnagel and engraved by Jacob who was only 19 years old at the time of publication. The Italian scholar Filippo Buonanni asserted in 1691 that these engravings are the first published instance of the use of the microscope. However, this assertion of Buonanni is still contested. As the quality of the engravings varies, it is assumed that some of the works were made by members of the family De Bry who resided in Frankfurt. The prints in the collections were intended not solely as representations of the real world. They also carried a religious meaning as they encouraged the contemplation of god's plan of creation. Like contemporary emblem books each print carried a motto typically referring to god's interference in the world. The prints of the book were used as models by other artists and the Hoefnagel motifs were copied until the 19th century. It has been argued that the prints stood at the basis of the typical Dutch genre of still lifes with flowers, shells and insects.

=== Painting ===
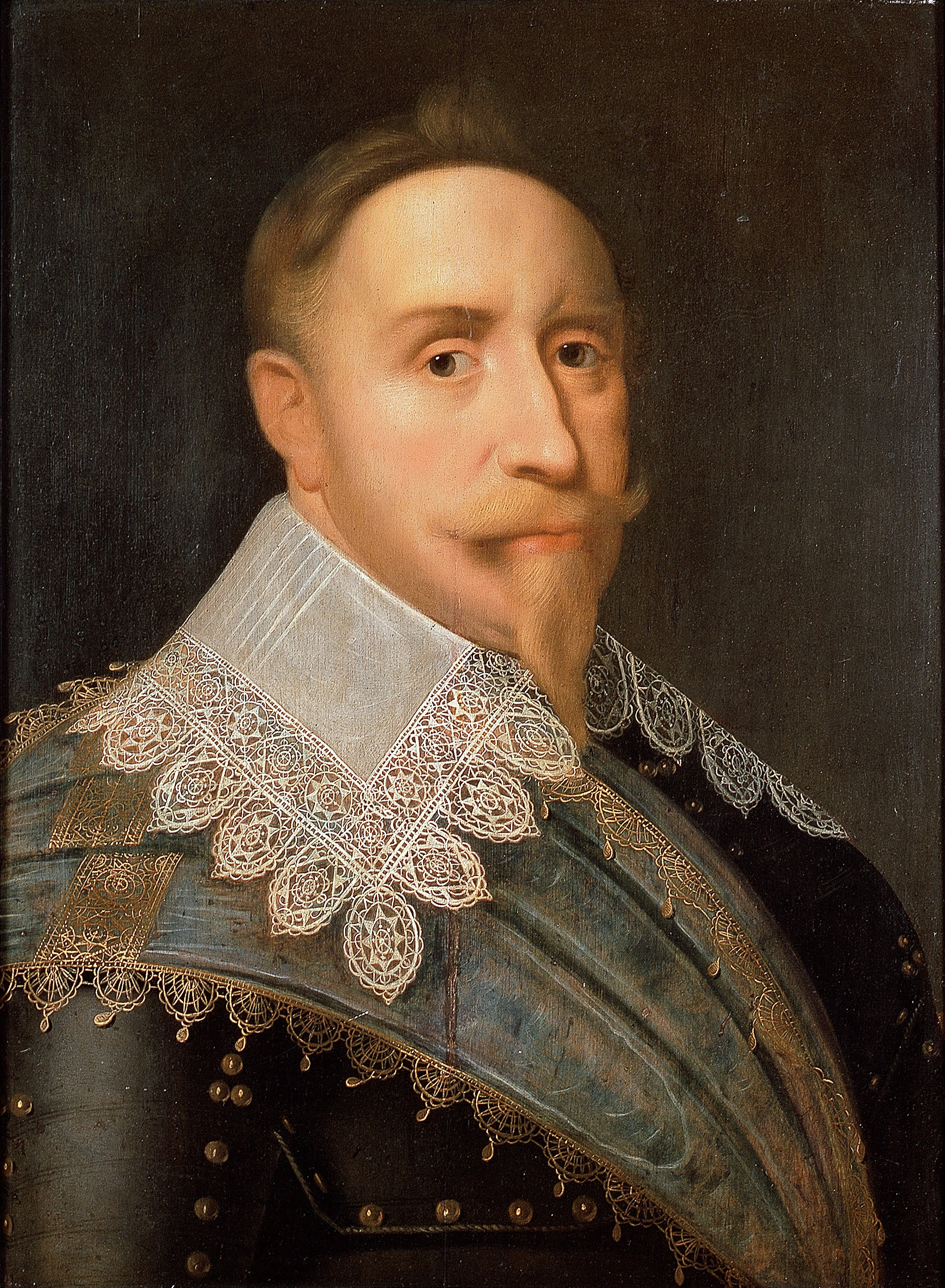
Portrait of king Gustaf Adolf of Sweden

Unlike his father who preferred drawing, Jacob was an accomplished oil painter who produced works in the Prague Mannerist style popularised by artists such as Hans von Aachen and Bartholomeus Spranger. As a painter Hoefnagel specialized in small format mythological or allegorical scenes on vellum or copper. During his stay at the court in Prague he produced many paintings of which only a few have survived. The Morgan Library & Museum holds an Orpheus charming the animals dated 1613 in a late Mannerist style and a Winter dated 1618. Only a few portraits of Hoefnagel are known, all executed during his stay in Sweden. These portraits include a bust portrait of king Gustaf Adolf (The Royal Armoury) and the queen consort Queen Maria Eleonore of Sweden dated around 1624. He received 150 national dollars and a gold chain from the king for this commission. The original of the oil painting of the queen consort is lost and is now known through the engraving made by Hendrik Hondius I in 1629.

He made in 1609 a topographically useful and at the same time artistically valuable view of the city of Vienna. Around the same time, he was in Vienna one of the contributors to a painted scientific work known as the "Museum or bestiary (Tierbuch) of Emperor Rudolf II", which consists of 180 parchment leaves and is kept in the Austrian National Library as cod. min. 129–130.

Two collaborations on small cabinet miniatures between father and son Hoefnagel are known, Diana and Actaeon (Louvre) and Allegory on Life and Death (British Museum).

=== Civitates orbis terrarum ===
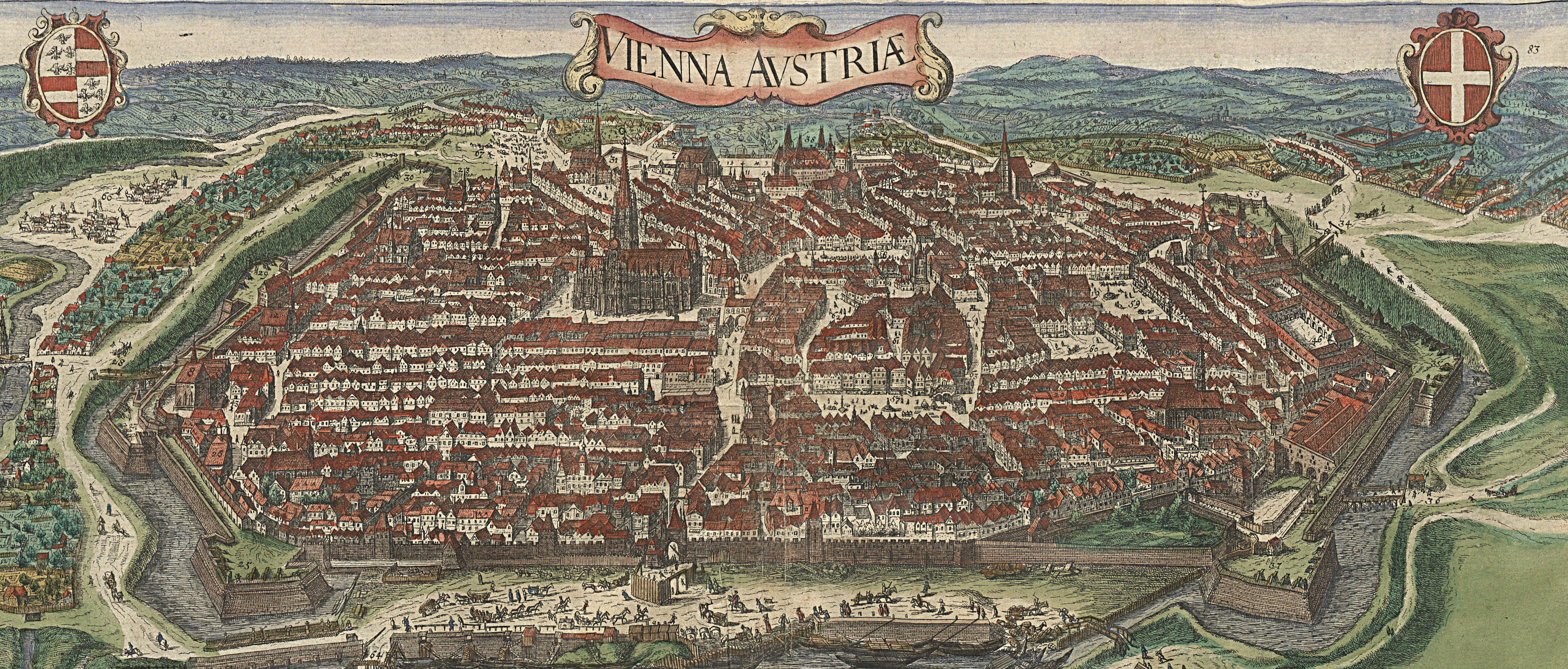
Vienna austriae

Jacob's father Joris had provided designs for the fifth volume of Civitates orbis terrarum, which consisted of prints of bird's-eye views and maps of cities from all around the world. The work was edited by Braun and largely engraved by Frans Hogenberg. Jacob reworked in 1617 designs of his father for the sixth volume of Civitates Orbis Terrarum, which was published in Cologne in 1618. Volume 6 contains a homogeneous series of images of cities in Central Europe (in Austria, Bohemia, Moravia, Hungary and Transylvania), which are very consistent in their graphics.

The views are in perspective, and only in a few cases, isometric and stand out through the accuracy of the information, the particular attention to the faithful representation of the territory, the landscape, the road conditions and the power of observation and refinement of interpretation.

=== Diversae insectarum volatilium icones ===
His Diversae insectarum volatilium icones ad vivum accuratissime depictae per celeberrimum pictorem, published by Claes Jansz. Visscher in Amsterdam in 1630 is one of the earliest works dealing exclusively with insects. The book consists of 16 prints engraved by Jacob after designs by his father. A single convex lens was used in the preparation of some of the drawings for this book. As far as known, the pictures of Hoefnagel are the earliest printed figures of magnified objects (Locy, The Story of Biology, p. 199). The 16 beautiful engravings depict 302 insects, in order: 37 Coleoptera, 22 Orthoptera, 14 Odonata, 16 Neuroptera, 72 Lepidoptera, 35 Hymenoptera, 78 Diptera, 21 Hemiptera, and 7 larvae; from central and northern Germany. Jacob Hoefnagels described the engraved copies of his father's designs as "A pattern or copy-book for artists, displaying on sixteen plates about 340 insects, mostly larger than life".

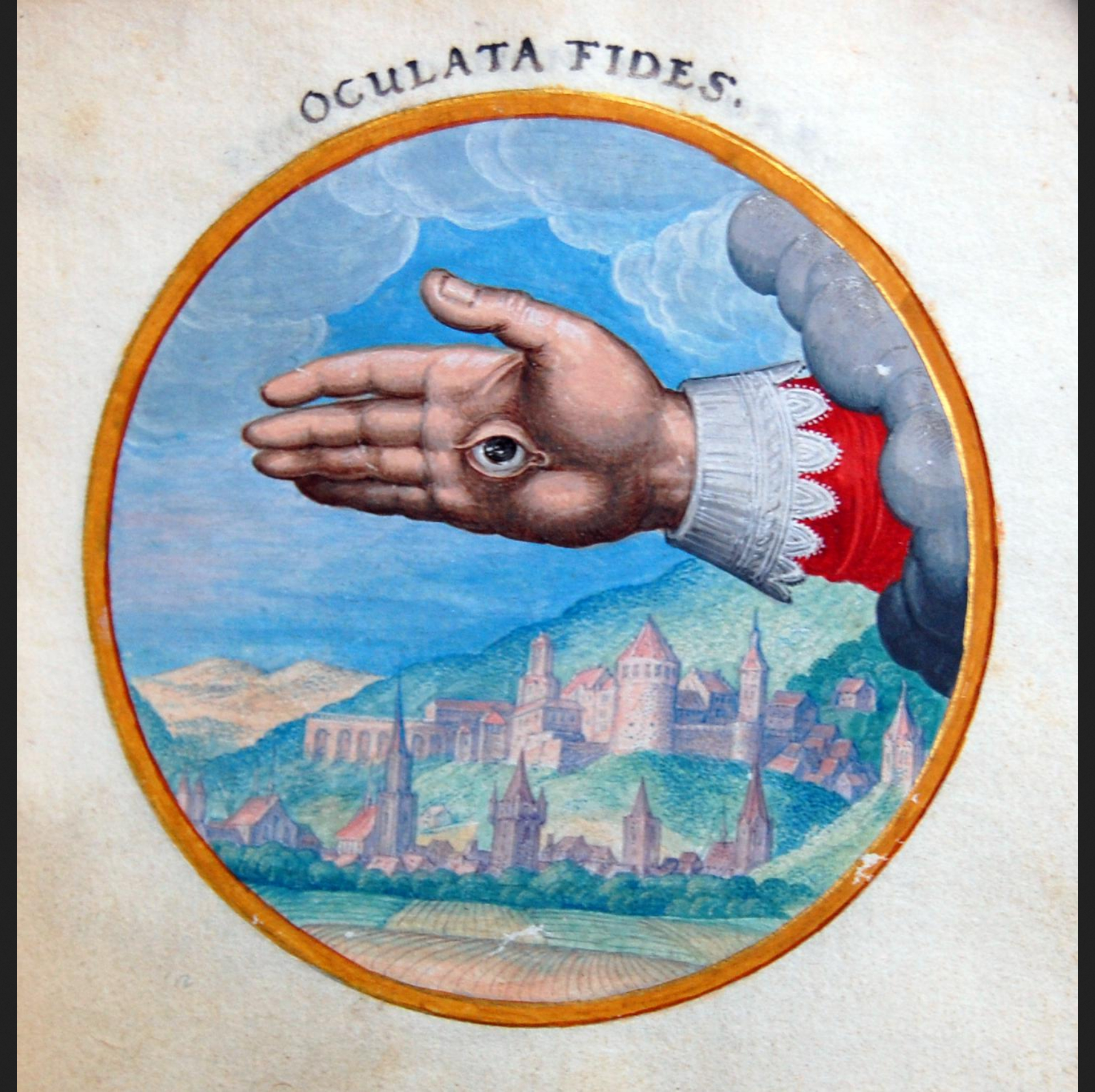
Oculata fides, from Gloria Crocodilus

The work was used by many artists as models and as such helped spread Joris Hoefnagel's fame. The Dutch biologist Jan Swammerdam mentioned that the insects were drawn from life. The publication of this book has sometimes been credited to a hypothetical brother of Jacob called Jan as the book was published in the year Jacob died and was published in the name of I. Hoefnagel. However, it is unlikely that the publication was a product of a brother of Jacob.

=== Gloria Crocodilus ===
An album of emblematic drawings entitled Gloria Crocodilus kept at the British Museum has been attributed to Jacob Hoefnagel. The album consists of 82 leaves, 63 of which bear miniature emblematic roundels in bodycolour, each inscribed with a title above in Latin. It was made in the Dutch Republic in 1634 and bound at an early date in Dutch red Morocco leather with elegant gilt tooling. The dedicatee is Godefridus Crell of Prussia, who may have been a member of the distinguished German Crell family. The attribution to Jacob Hoefnagel is based on the drawings' resemblance to his series of emblematic roundels now in the Museum of Fine Arts in Budapest. The attribution has been questioned by art historian Thea Vignau-Wilberg.
