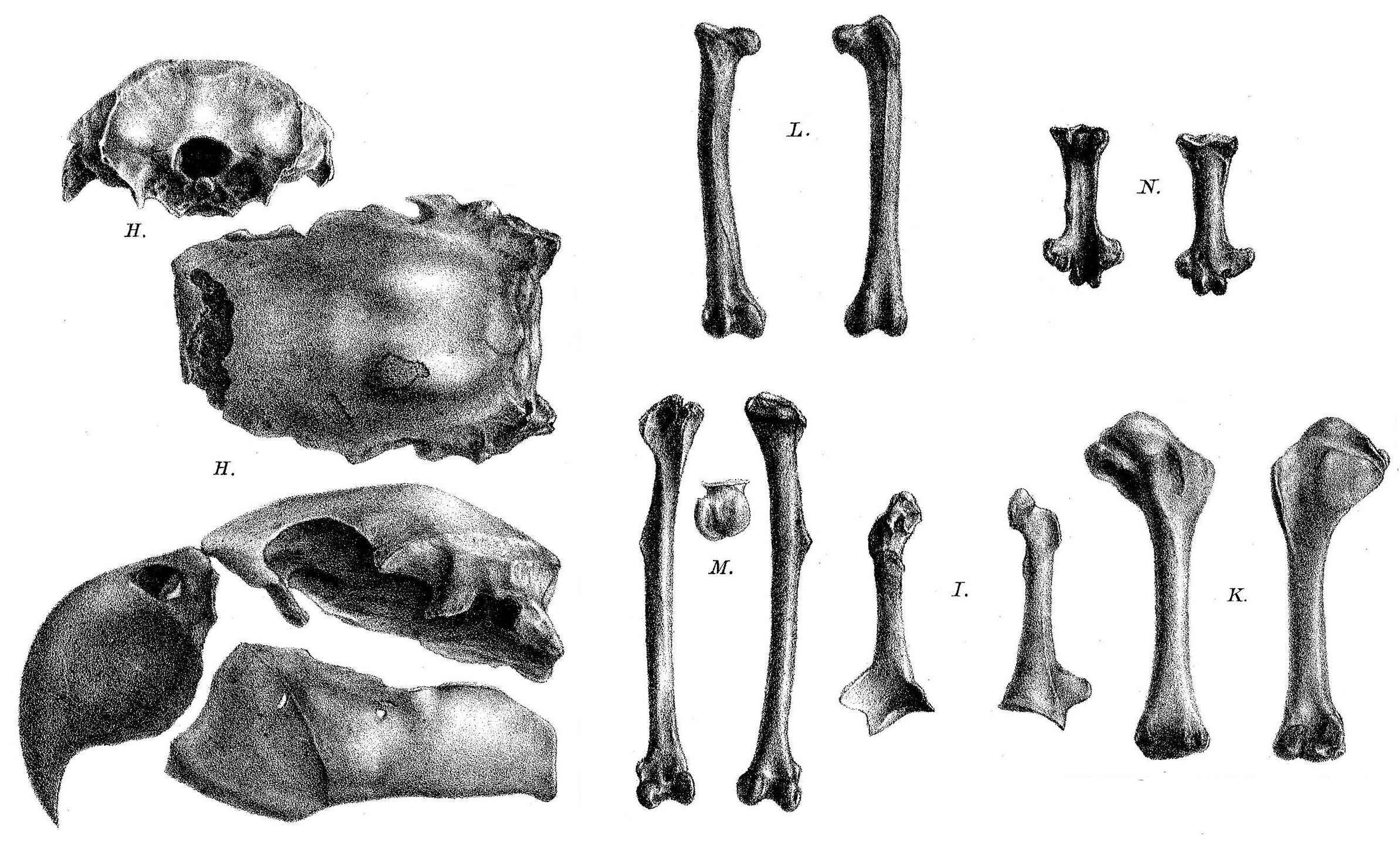
- Subfossil skull and limb bones, 1879

Conservation status
- Extinct (soon after 1761) (IUCN 3.1)

Scientific classification
- Kingdom: Animalia
- Phylum: Chordata
- Class: Aves
- Order: Psittaciformes
- Family: Psittaculidae
- Genus: Necropsittacus; Milne-Edwards, 1873
- Species: †N. rodricanus

Binomial name
- †Necropsittacus rodricanus (Milne-Edwards, 1867)
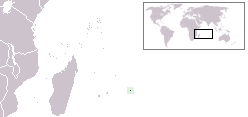
- Location of Rodrigues

Synonyms
- Psittacus rodricanus Milne-Edwards, 1867; Psittacus rodericanus Milne-Edwards, 1873; Necropsittacus rodericanus Newton, 1875

= Rodrigues parrot =

Extinct species of parrot that was endemic to Rodrigues

The Rodrigues parrot or Leguat's parrot (Necropsittacus rodricanus) is an extinct species of parrot that was endemic to the Mascarene island of Rodrigues. The species is known from subfossil bones and from mentions in contemporary accounts. It is unclear to which other species it is most closely related, but it is classified as a member of the tribe Psittaculini, along with other Mascarene parrots. The Rodrigues parrot bore similarities to the broad-billed parrot of Mauritius, and may have been related. Two additional species have been assigned to its genus (N. francicus and N. borbonicus), based on descriptions of parrots from the other Mascarene islands, but their identities and validity have been debated.

The Rodrigues parrot was green, and had a proportionally large head and beak and a long tail. Its exact size is unknown, but it may have been around 50 cm (20 in) long. It was the largest parrot on Rodrigues, and it had the largest head of any Mascarene parrot. It may have looked similar to the great-billed parrot. By the time it was discovered, it frequented and nested on islets off southern Rodrigues, where introduced rats were absent, and fed on the seeds of the shrub Fernelia buxifolia. The species was last mentioned in 1761, and probably became extinct soon after, perhaps due to a combination of predation by introduced animals, deforestation, and hunting by humans.

== Taxonomy ==
Birds thought to be the Rodrigues parrot were first mentioned by the French traveler François Leguat in his 1708 memoir, A New Voyage to the East Indies. Leguat was the leader of a group of nine French Huguenot refugees who colonised Rodrigues between 1691 and 1693 after they were marooned there. Subsequent accounts were written by the French sailor Julien Tafforet, who was marooned on the island in 1726, in his Relation de l'Île Rodrigue, and then by the French astronomer Alexandre Pingré, who travelled to Rodrigues to view the 1761 transit of Venus.

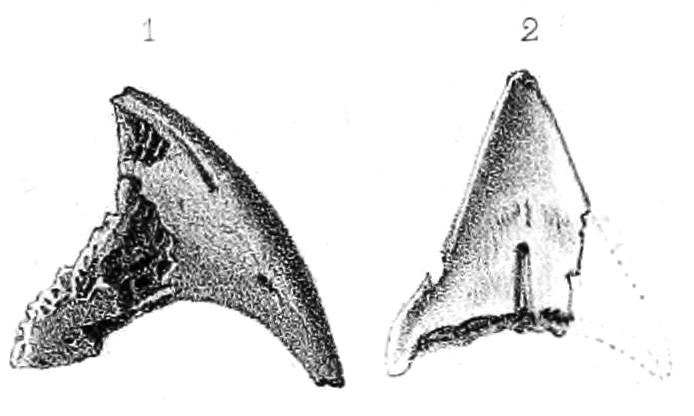
Holotype upper beak, 1867

In 1867, the French zoologist Alphonse Milne-Edwards described subfossil bird bones from Rodrigues he had received via the British ornithologist Alfred Newton, which had been excavated under the supervision of his brother, Colonial Secretary Edward Newton. Among the bones was a fragmentary front part of an upper beak that he identified as belonging to a parrot. Based on this beak, he scientifically described and named the new species Psittacus rodricanus. While he found the bone similar to the beaks of the lories in the genus Eclectus, he preferred to give it a less precise classification than assigning it to that genus, due to the scant remains.

The specific name rodricanus refers to Rodrigues, which is itself named after the discoverer of the island, the Portuguese navigator Diogo Rodrigues. Milne-Edwards corrected the spelling of the specific name to rodericanus (in a footnote in an 1873 compilation of his articles about extinct birds that included the original description), a spelling which was used in the literature henceforward, but was changed back to rodricanus by the IOC World Bird List in 2014. After receiving a more complete upper and lower beak which he thought showed the bird to be close to the parrot genus Palaeornis, Milne-Edwards moved the species to its own genus Necropsittacus in 1873; the name is derived from the Greek words nekros, which means dead, and psittakos, parrot, in reference to the bird being extinct.

In another footnote to his 1873 compilation, Milne-Edwards correlated the subfossil species with parrots mentioned by Leguat. In 1875, A. Newton analysed Tafforet's then newly rediscovered account, and identified a description of the Rodrigues parrot. In a footnote in an 1891 edition of Leguat's memoir, the British writer Samuel Pasfield Oliver doubted that the parrots mentioned were the Rodrigues parrot, due to their smaller size, and suggested they may have been Newton's parakeet. As Leguat mentioned both green and blue parrots in the same sentence, the British palaeontologist Julian Hume suggested in 2007 that these could either be interpreted as references to both the Rodrigues parrot and Newton's parakeet, or as two colour morphs of the latter.

The current whereabouts of the holotype beak are unknown. It may be specimen UMZC 575, a rostrum that was sent from Milne-Edwards to A. Newton after 1880, which matches the drawing and description in Milne-Edwards's paper, but this cannot be confirmed. In 1879 the German ornithologist Albert Günther and E. Newton described more fossils of the Rodrigues parrot, including a skull and limb bones. Remains of the species are scarce, but subfossils have been discovered in caves on the Plaine Corail and in Caverne Tortue.

=== Evolution ===
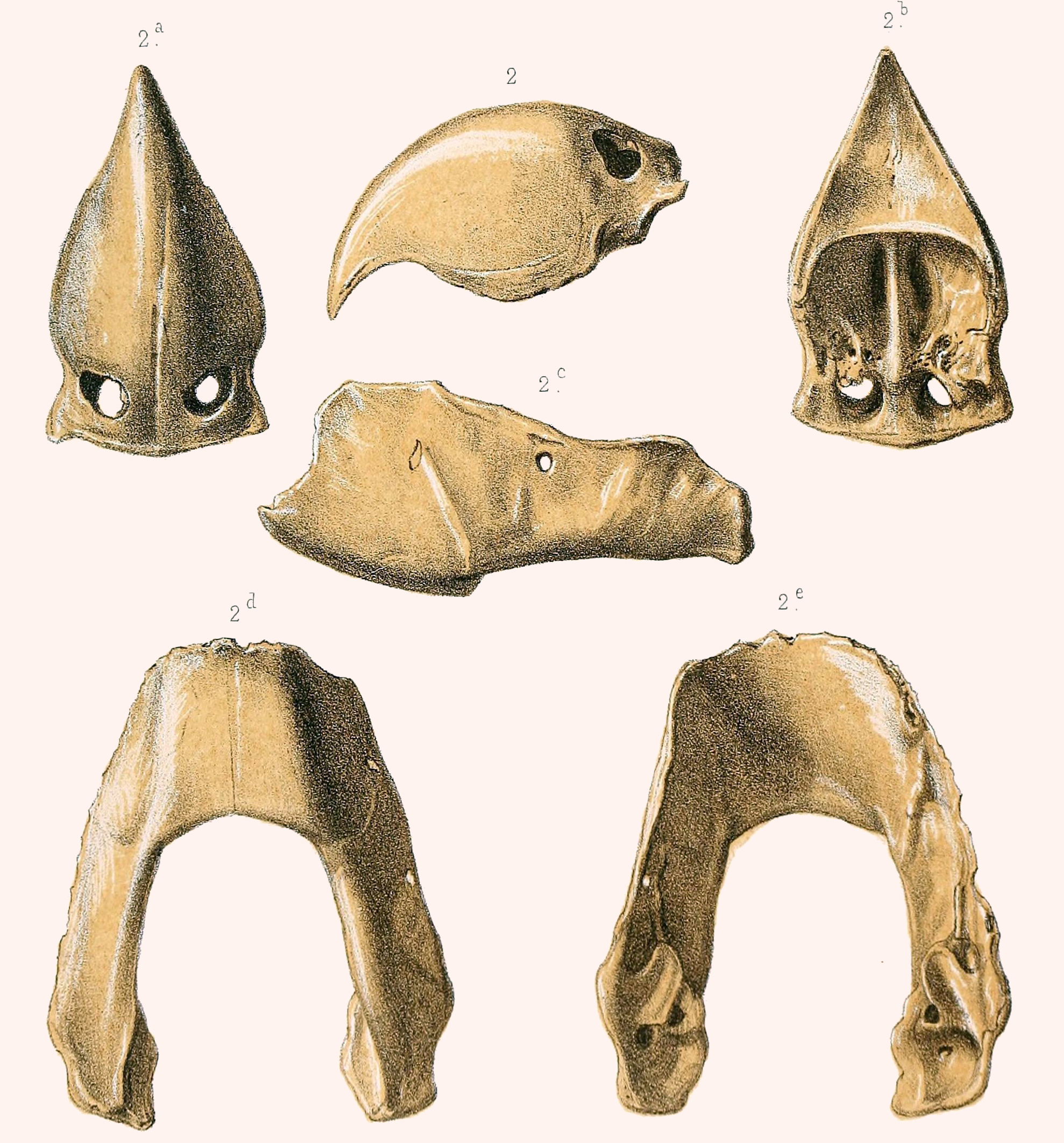
Assigned beak, 1873

Many endemic Mascarene birds, including the dodo, are derived from South Asian ancestors, and the British ecologist Anthony S. Cheke and Hume have proposed that this may be the case for all the parrots there as well. Sea levels were lower during the Pleistocene, so it was possible for species to colonise some of the then less isolated islands. Although most extinct parrot species of the Mascarenes are poorly known, subfossil remains show that they shared features such as enlarged heads and jaws, reduced pectoral bones, and robust leg bones. In 1893, E. Newton and the German ornithologist Hans Gadow found the Rodrigues parrot to be closely related to the broad-billed parrot due to their large jaws and other osteological features, but were unable to determine whether they both belonged in the same genus, since a head-crest was only known from the latter. The British ornithologist Graham S. Cowles instead found their skulls too dissimilar for them to be close relatives in 1987.

Hume has suggested that the Mascarene parrots have a common origin in the radiation of the tribe Psittaculini, basing this theory on morphological features and the fact that parrots of that group have managed to colonise many isolated islands in the Indian Ocean. The Psittaculini may have invaded the area several times, as many of the species were so specialised that they may have evolved significantly on hotspot islands before the Mascarenes emerged from the sea.

=== Hypothetical extinct relatives ===
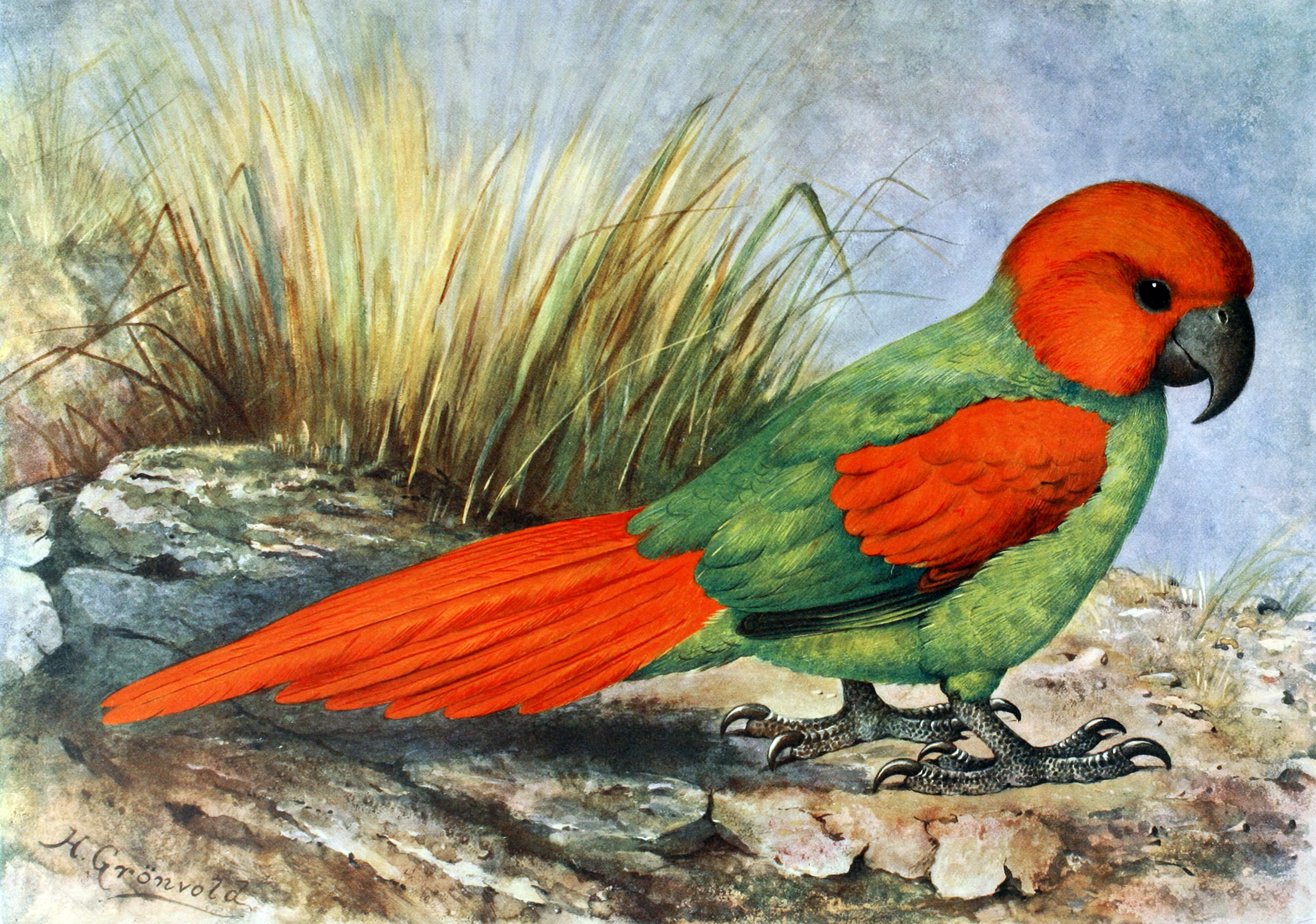
1907 illustration by Henrik Grönvold, showing the colouration of the hypothetical species N. borbonicus combined with the body-plan of the Rodrigues parrot

The British zoologist Walther Rothschild assigned two hypothetical parrot species from the other Mascarene Islands to the genus Necropsittacus; N. francicus in 1905 and N. borbonicus in 1907. Rothschild gave the original description of N. francicus as "head and tail fiery red, rest of body and tail green", and stated it was based on descriptions from voyages to Mauritius in the 17th and early 18th century. N. borbonicus (named for Bourbon, the original name of Réunion) was based on a single account by the French traveller Sieur Dubois, who mentioned "green parrots of the same size [presumably as the Réunion parakeet] with head, upper parts of the wings, and tail the colour of fire" on Réunion. Rothschild considered it to belong to Necropsittacus since Dubois compared it to related species.

The two assigned Necropsittacus species have since become the source of much taxonomic confusion, and their identities have been debated. N. borbonicus later received common names such as Réunion red and green parakeet or Réunion parrot, and N. francicus has been called the Mauritian parrot. The Japanese ornithologist Masauji Hachisuka recognised N. borbonicus in 1953, and published a restoration of it with the colouration described by Dubois and the body-plan of the Rodrigues parrot. He did not find the naming of N. francicus to have been necessary, but expressed hope more evidence would be found. In 1967, the American ornithologist James Greenway suggested that N. borbonicus may have been an escaped pet lory seen by Dubois, since 16th century Dutch paintings show the somewhat similar East Indian chattering lory, presumably in captivity. However, Greenway was unable to find any references that matched those Rothschild had given for N. francicus.

In 1987, Cheke found the described colour-pattern of N. borbonicus remiscent of Psittacula parrots, but considered N. francicus to be based on confused reports. In 2001 the British writer Errol Fuller suggested Dubois's account of N. borbonicus could either have referred to an otherwise unrecorded species or have been misleading, and found N. francicus to be "one of the most dubious of all hypothetical species". In 2007, Hume suggested that Rothschild had associated N. borbonicus with the Rodrigues parrot because he had mistakenly incorporated Dubois's account into his description of the latter; he stated the Rodrigues parrot also had red plumage (though it was all-green), and had been mentioned by Dubois (who never visited Rodrigues). Rothschild also attributed the sighting of N. francicus to Dubois, repeating the colour-pattern he had described earlier for the Rodrigues parrot, and this led Hume to conclude that the name N. francicus was based solely on "the muddled imagination of Lord Rothschild". Hume added that if Dubois's description of N. borbonicus was based on a parrot endemic to Réunion, it may have been derived from the Alexandrine parakeet, which has a similar colouration, apart from the red tail.

== Description ==
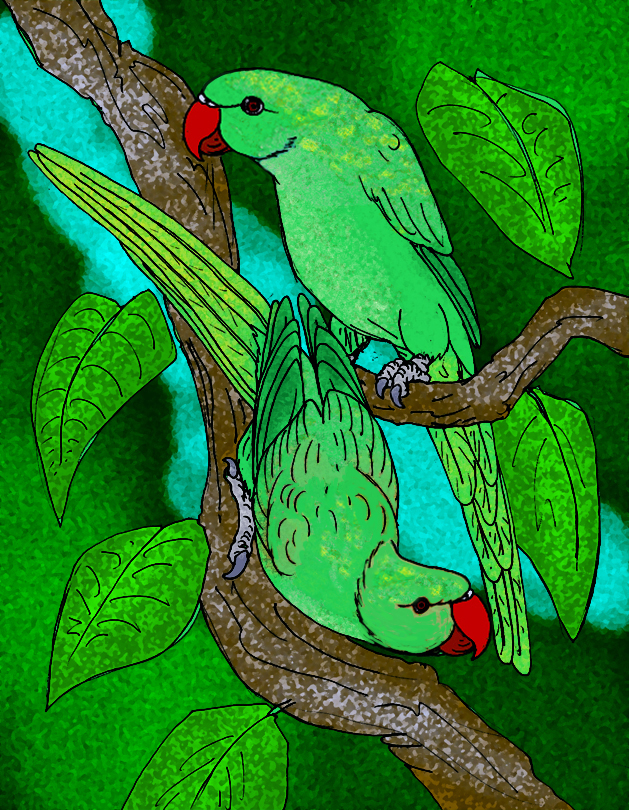
Life restoration of two Rodrigues parrots

The Rodrigues parrot was described as being the largest parrot species on the island, with a big head and a long tail. Its plumage was described as being of uniform green colouration. Its skull was flat and depressed compared to those of most other parrots, but similar to the genus Ara. The skull was 50 mm (2.0 in) long without the beak, 38 mm (1.5 in) wide, and 24 mm (0.94 in) deep. The coracoid (part of the shoulder) was 35 mm (1.4 in) long, the humerus (upper-arm bone) 53 mm (2.1 in), the ulna (lower-arm bone) 57 mm (2.2 in), the femur (thigh-bone) 49 mm (1.9 in), the tibia (lower-leg bone) 63 mm (2.5 in), and the metatarsus (foot bone) 22 mm (0.87 in). Its exact body length is unknown, but it may have been around 50 cm (20 in), comparable to the size of a large cockatoo. Its tibia was 32% smaller than that of a female broad-billed parrot, yet the pectoral bones were of similar size, and proportionally its head was the largest of any Mascarene species of parrot.

The Rodrigues parrot was similar in skeletal structure to the parrot genera Tanygnathus and Psittacula. The pectoral and pelvic bones were similar in size to those of the New Zealand kaka, and it may have looked like the great-billed parrot in life, but with a larger head and tail. It differed from other Mascarene parrots in several skeletal features, including having nostrils that faced upwards instead of forwards. No features of the skull suggest it had a crest like the broad-billed parrot, and there is not enough fossil evidence to determine whether it had pronounced sexual dimorphism. There are intermediate specimens between the longest and shortest examples of the known skeletal elements, which indicates there were no distinct size groups.

== Behaviour and ecology ==
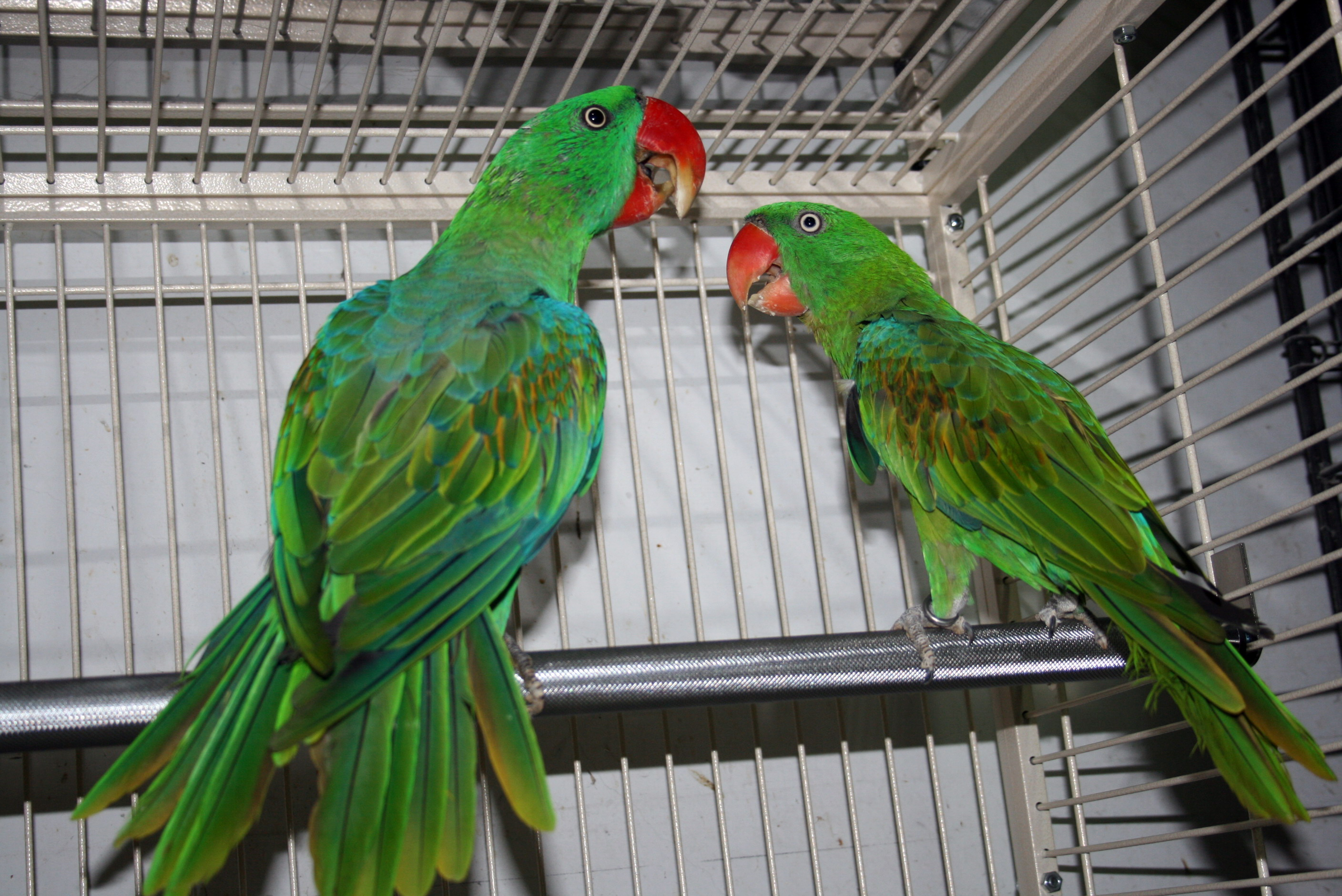
The Rodrigues parrot may have resembled the great-billed parrot

Tafforet's 1726 description is the only detailed account of the Rodrigues parrot in life:

The largest are larger than a pigeon, and have a tail very long, the head large as well as the beak. They mostly come on the islets which are to the south of the island, where they eat a small black seed, which produces a small shrub whose leaves have the smell of the orange tree, and come to the mainland to drink water ... they have their plumage green.

Tafforet also mentioned that the parrots ate the seeds of the shrub Fernelia buxifolia ("bois de buis"), which is endangered today, but was common all over Rodrigues and nearby islets during his visit. Leguat mentioned that the parrots of the island ate the nuts of the tree Cassine orientalis ("bois d'olive"). Due to a large population of introduced rats on Rodrigues, the parrots, the Rodrigues starling, and the Rodrigues pigeon, frequented and nested on offshore islets, where the rats were absent.

Many of the other endemic species of Rodrigues became extinct after the arrival of humans, so the ecosystem of the island is heavily damaged. Before humans arrived, forests covered the island entirely, but very little remains today due to deforestation. The Rodrigues parrot lived alongside other recently extinct birds such as the Rodrigues solitaire, the Rodrigues rail, Newton's parakeet, the Rodrigues starling, the Rodrigues scops owl, the Rodrigues night heron, and the Rodrigues pigeon. Extinct reptiles include the domed Rodrigues giant tortoise, the saddle-backed Rodrigues giant tortoise, and the Rodrigues day gecko.

== Extinction ==
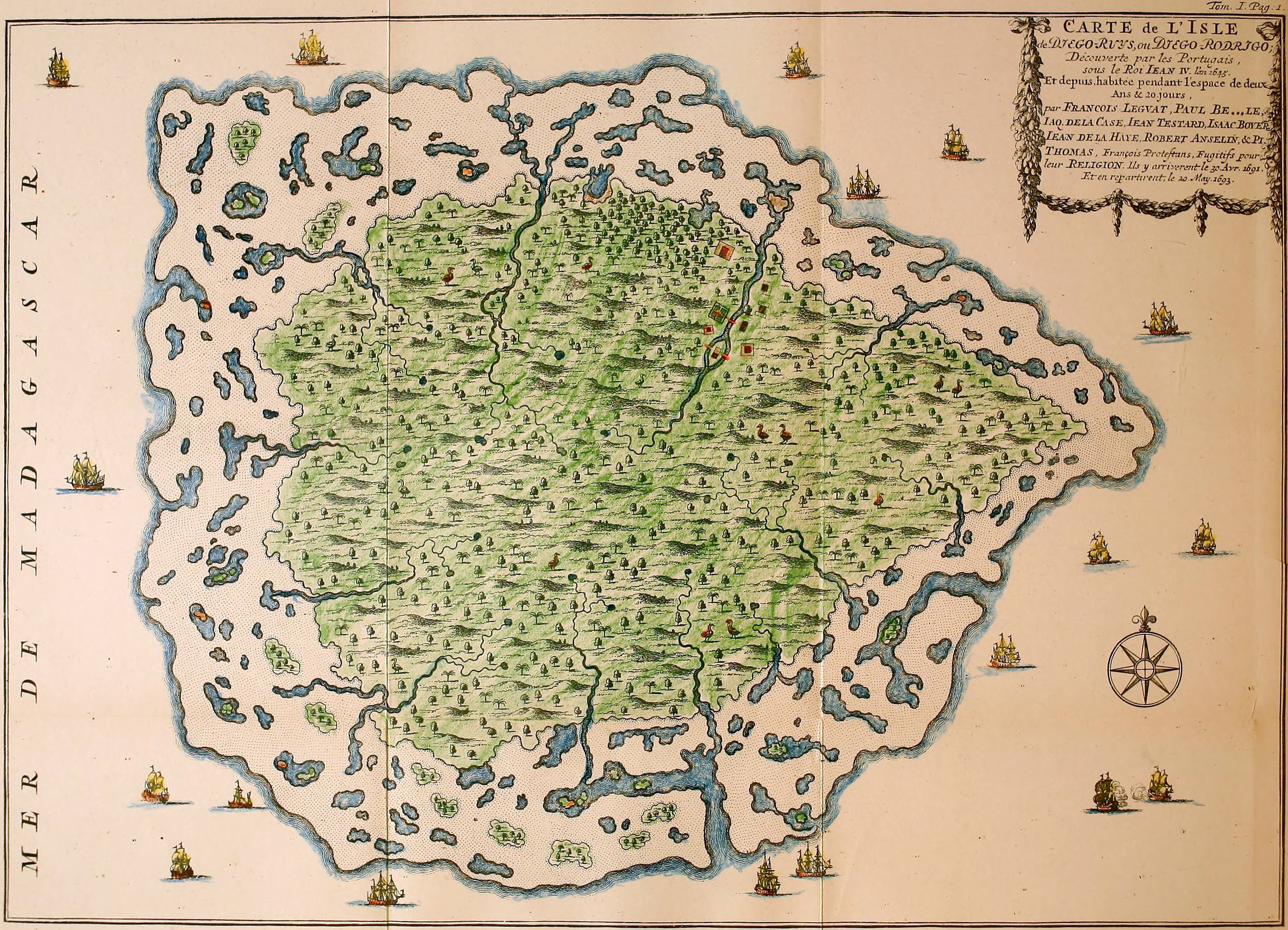
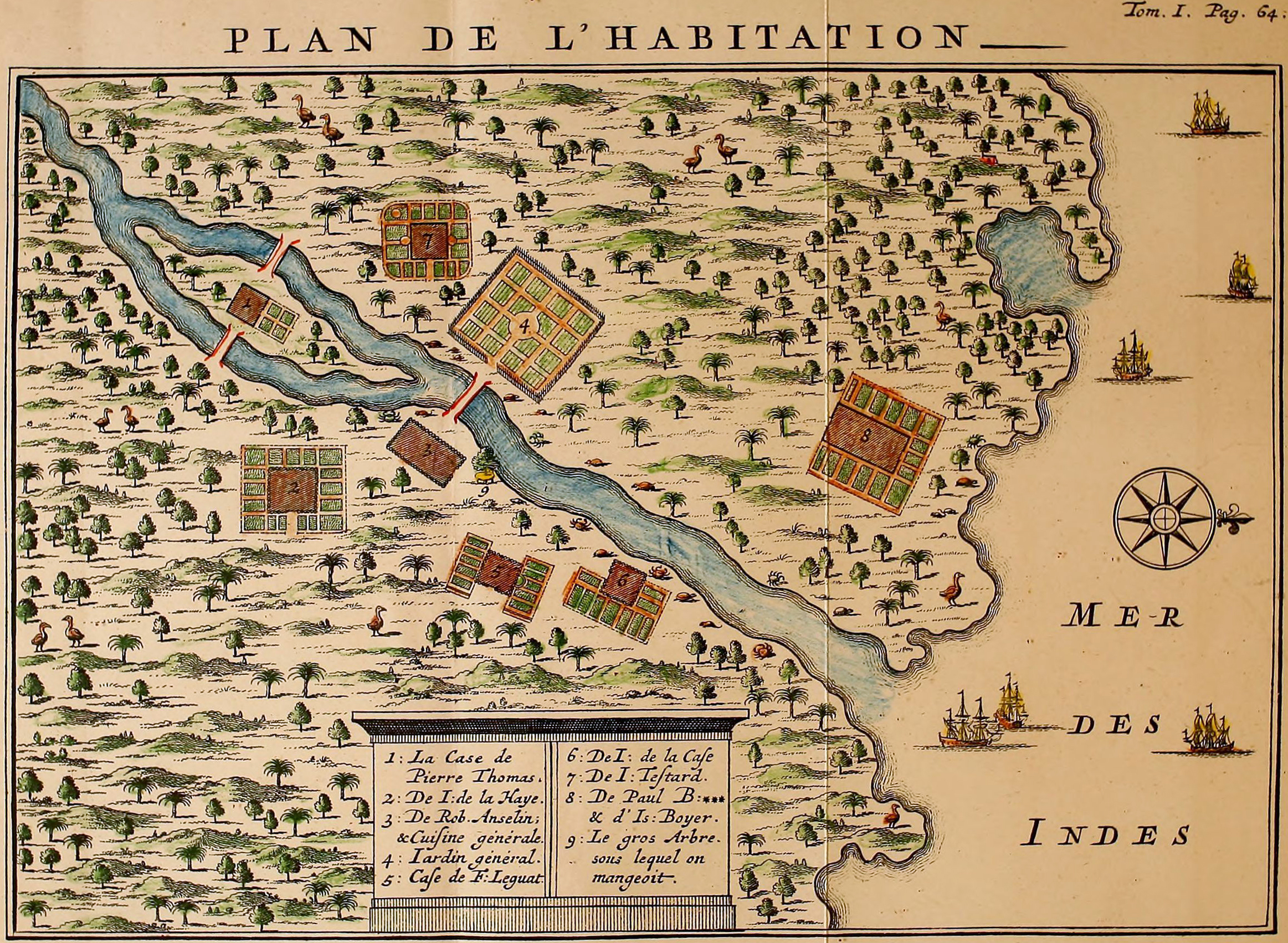
François Leguat's 1708 maps of Rodrigues and his settlement

Of the eight or so parrot species endemic to the Mascarenes, only the echo parakeet of Mauritius has survived. The others were likely all made extinct by a combination of excessive hunting and deforestation by humans. Like mainland Rodrigues, the offshore islets were eventually infested by rats, which is believed to have caused the demise of the Rodrigues parrot and other birds there. Cats may also have hunted the remaining birds. The rats probably preyed on their eggs and chicks.

Leguat mentioned use of local parrots as food, but it is uncertain whether the green species was the Rodrigues parrot or a green Newton's parakeet:

There are abundance of green and blew Parrets, they are of a midling and equal bigness; when they are young, their Flesh is as good as young Pigeons.

Pingré indicated in 1671 that local species were popular game, and found that the Rodrigues parrot was rare:

The perruche [Newton's parakeet] seemed to me much more delicate [than the flying-fox]. I would not have missed any game from France if this one had been commoner in Rodrigues; but it begins to become rare. There are even fewer perroquets [Rodrigues parrots], although there were once a big enough quantity according to François Leguat; indeed a little islet south of Rodrigues still retains the name Isle of Parrots [Isle Pierrot].

Pingré also reported that the island was becoming deforested by tortoise hunters who set fires to clear vegetation. Along with direct hunting of the parrots, this likely led to a reduction in the population of Rodrigues parrots. Pingré's 1761 account is the last known mention of the species, and it probably became extinct soon after, according to Hume. An 1893 account by the island's magistrate Barthélemy Hardy Colin stated that in former times there "were a great number of large green parrots, but they died away after the large fire which destroyed the forests on the western side of the island", but gave no date for when it occurred, perhaps alluding to this species according to Cheke.
