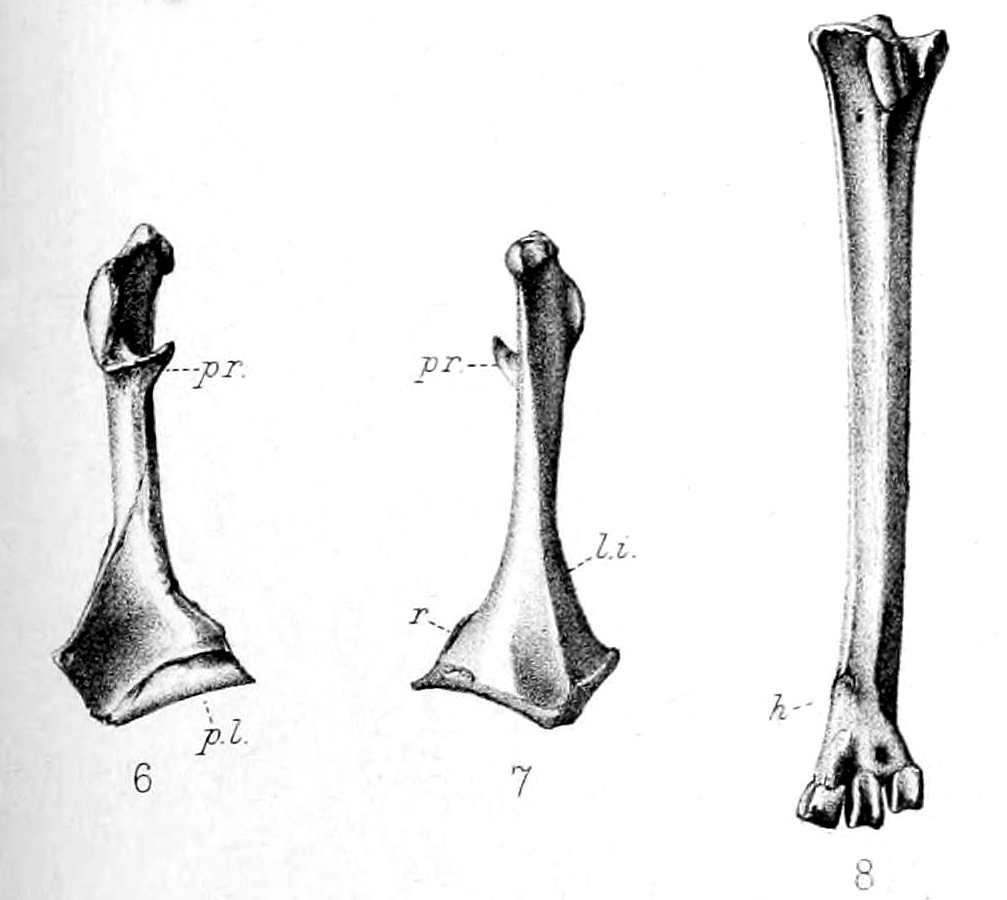
- Subfossil coracoid (6-7) and tarsometatarsus (8)

Conservation status
- Extinct (c. 1690s?) (IUCN 3.1)

Scientific classification
- Kingdom: Animalia
- Phylum: Chordata
- Class: Aves
- Order: Pelecaniformes
- Family: Ardeidae
- Genus: Nycticorax
- Species: †N. mauritianus

Binomial name
- †Nycticorax mauritianus (Newton & Gadow, 1893)
- Location of Mauritius

Synonyms
- Butorides mauritianus Newton & Gadow, 1893

= Mauritius night heron =

Extinct species of bird

The Mauritius night heron (Nycticorax mauritianus) is an extinct night heron species from Mauritius. It is only known by seven subfossil bone remains consisted of cranium, pelvis, coracoid, ulna, radius, and tarsometatarsus found in Mare aux Songes. Only the coracoid and the tarsometatarsus are left today. It was scientifically described in 1893 by Edward Newton and Hans Gadow from the University of Cambridge. Newton and Gadow measured the tarsometatarsus with 81 to 87 mm. It became presumedly extinct shortly after it was first mentioned by François Leguat in 1693 who described them as a "great flight of bitterns".
