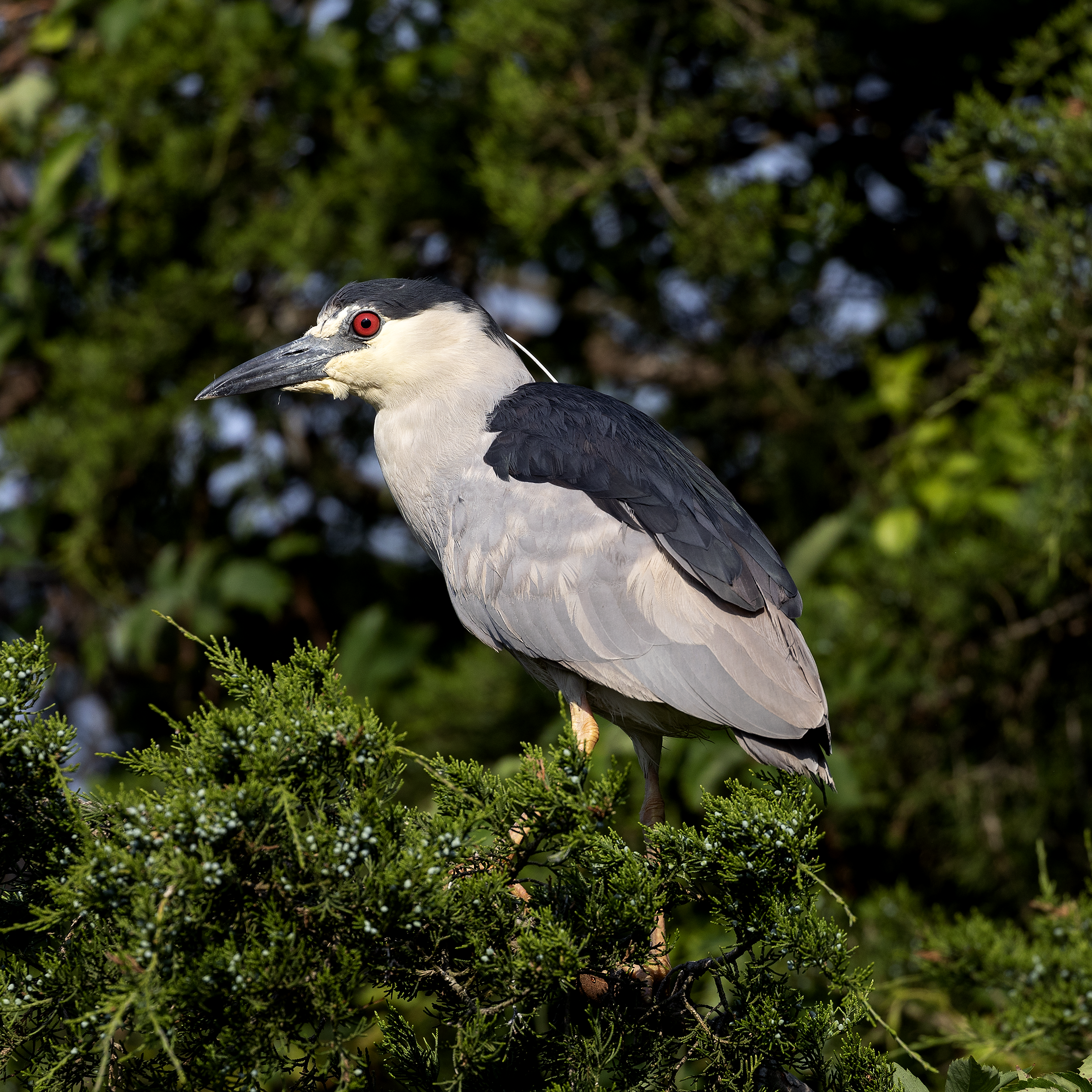
- Black-crowned night heron (Nycticorax nycticorax)

Scientific classification
- Kingdom: Animalia
- Phylum: Chordata
- Class: Aves
- Order: Pelecaniformes
- Family: Ardeidae
- Subfamily: Ardeinae
- Genus: Nycticorax; T. Forster, 1817

Type species
- Nycticorax infaustus = Ardea nycticorax T. Forster, 1817

Species
- 2 extant, see text

= Nycticorax =

Nycticorax Temporal range: Early Oligocene to present

Genus of birds

Nycticorax is a genus of night herons. The name Nycticorax means "night raven" and derives from the Ancient Greek νύκτος, nuktos "night" and κοραξ, korax, "raven". It refers to the largely nocturnal feeding habits of this group of birds, and the croaking crow-like call of the best known species, the black-crowned night heron.

== Description ==
These are medium-sized herons which often are migratory in the colder parts of their ranges.

Adults are short-necked, relatively short-legged and stout herons; the two extant species both have a black crown and a whitish belly, while the wings, chest, neck and auriculars are grey or rufous depending on the species. Young birds are brown, flecked with white and grey, and are quite similar to each other in the extant species. At least some of the extinct Mascarenes taxa appear to have retained this juvenile plumage in adult birds.

== Breeding ==
Night herons nest in colonies on platforms of sticks in a group of trees, or on the ground in protected locations such as islands or reed beds. Three to eight eggs are laid.

== Diet ==
They stand at the water's edge, and wait to ambush prey, mainly at night. They primarily eat small fish, crustaceans, frogs, aquatic insects, and small mammals. During the day they rest in trees or bushes.

== Taxonomy ==
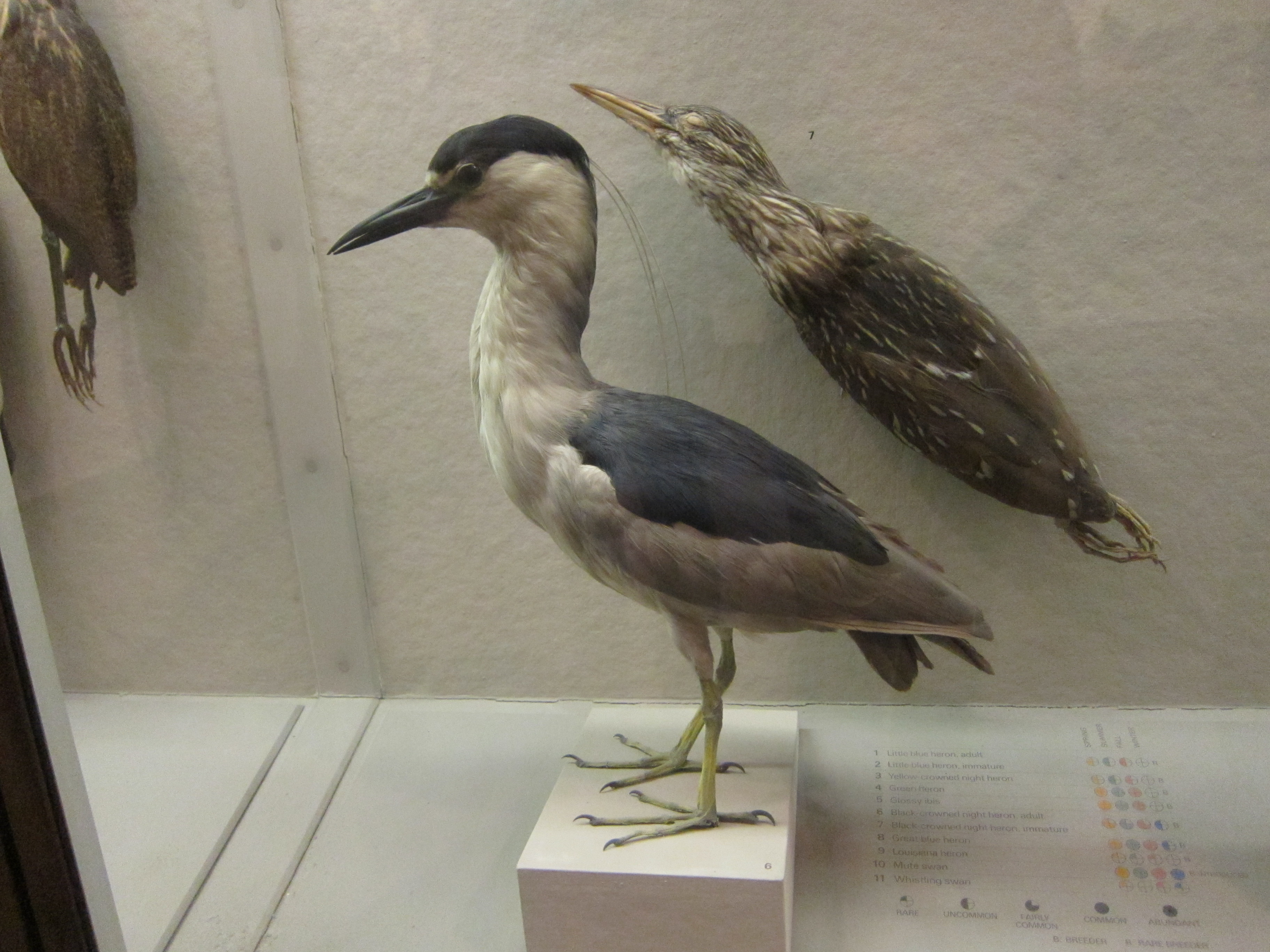
Stuffed night heron in the American Museum of Natural History

The genus Nycticorax was introduced in 1817 by the English naturalist Thomas Forster to accommodate the black-crowned night heron. The epithet nycticorax is from Ancient Greek and combines nux, nuktos meaning "night" and korax meaning "raven". The word was used by authors such as Aristotle and Hesychius of Miletus for a "bird of ill omen", perhaps an owl. The word was used by the Swiss naturalist Conrad Gessner in 1555 and then by subsequent authors for the black-crowned night heron.

In addition to the species listed below, the night herons of the genera Nyctanassa and Gorsachius were formerly placed in Nycticorax. The genus now contains just two species.

=== Extant species ===
Genus Nycticorax – T. Forster, 1817 – two species
Common name	Scientific name and subspecies	Range	Size and ecology	IUCN status and estimated population
Black-crowned night heron	Nycticorax nycticorax (Linnaeus, 1758) Four subspecies: N. n. nycticorax (Linnaeus, 1758); N. n. hoactli (Gmelin, 1789); N. n. obscurus (Bonaparte, 1855); N. n. falklandicus (Hartert, EJO, 1914)	Europe, Asia, Africa, North and South America	Size: Habitat: Diet:	LC
Nankeen night heron or rufous night heron	Nycticorax caledonicus (Gmelin, 1789) Six subspecies: N. c. caledonicus (Gmelin, 1789); N. c. manillensis Vigors, 1831; N. c. crassirostris Vigors, 1839; N. c. mandibularis Ogilvie-Grant, 1888; N. c. hilli Mathews, 1912; N. c. pelewensis Mathews, 1926	Australia, New Zealand, the Philippines, Papua New Guinea, the Solomon Islands, Java, New Caledonia, Palau, and the Caroline Islands, Federated States of Micronesia	Size: Habitat: Diet:	LC

=== Extinct species and fossils ===
- Rodrigues night heron, Nycticorax megacephalus (extinct)
- Réunion night heron, Nycticorax duboisi (extinct)
- Mauritius night heron, Nycticorax mauritianus (extinct)
- Ascension night heron, Nycticorax olsoni (extinct)
- Niue night heron, Nycticorax kalavikai (prehistoric)
- ʻEua night heron, Nycticorax sp. (prehistoric)
- Lifuka night heron, Nycticorax sp. (prehistoric) – may be same as ʻEua species
- Mangaia night heron, Nycticorax sp. (prehistoric)

In addition, the following taxa are known from fossil bones:

- Nycticorax sp. (Early Oligocene of Fayyum, Egypt) (fossil)
- Nycticorax fidens (Late Miocene of McGehee Farm, US) (fossil)
