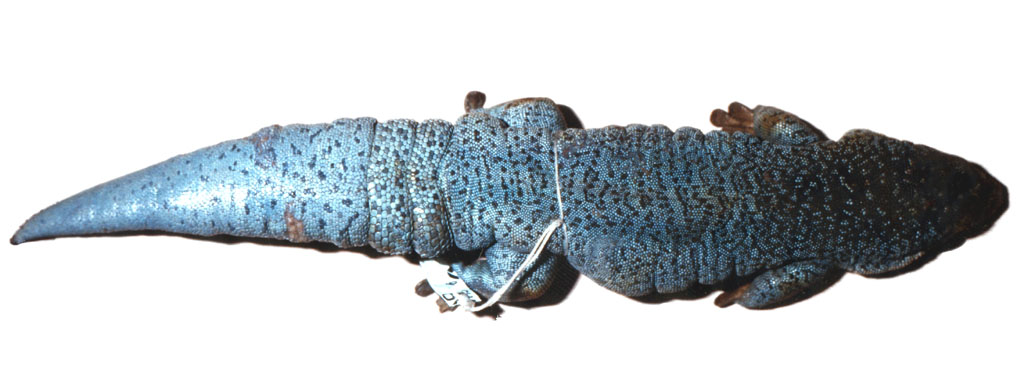
- Museum specimen

Conservation status
- Extinct (1917) (IUCN 3.1)

Scientific classification
- Kingdom: Animalia
- Phylum: Chordata
- Class: Reptilia
- Order: Squamata
- Suborder: Gekkota
- Family: Gekkonidae
- Genus: Phelsuma
- Species: †P. edwardnewtoni

Binomial name
- †Phelsuma edwardnewtoni J. Vinson & J.-M. Vinson, 1969

Synonyms
- Phelsuma newtoni Boulenger, 1884; Phelsuma newtonii — Boulenger, 1885; Phelsuma edwardnewtoni J. Vinson & J.-M. Vinson, 1969; Phelsuma edwardnewtoni — Kluge, 1993; Phelsuma edwardnewtoni — Rösler, 2000

= Rodrigues day gecko =

Extinct species of lizard

The Rodrigues day gecko (Phelsuma edwardnewtoni), also known commonly as the Rodrigues blue-dotted day gecko, is an extinct species of day gecko, a lizard in the family Gekkonidae. The species was endemic to the island of Rodrigues, where it typically inhabited forests and dwelt in trees. The Rodrigues day gecko fed on insects and nectar.

== Taxonomy ==
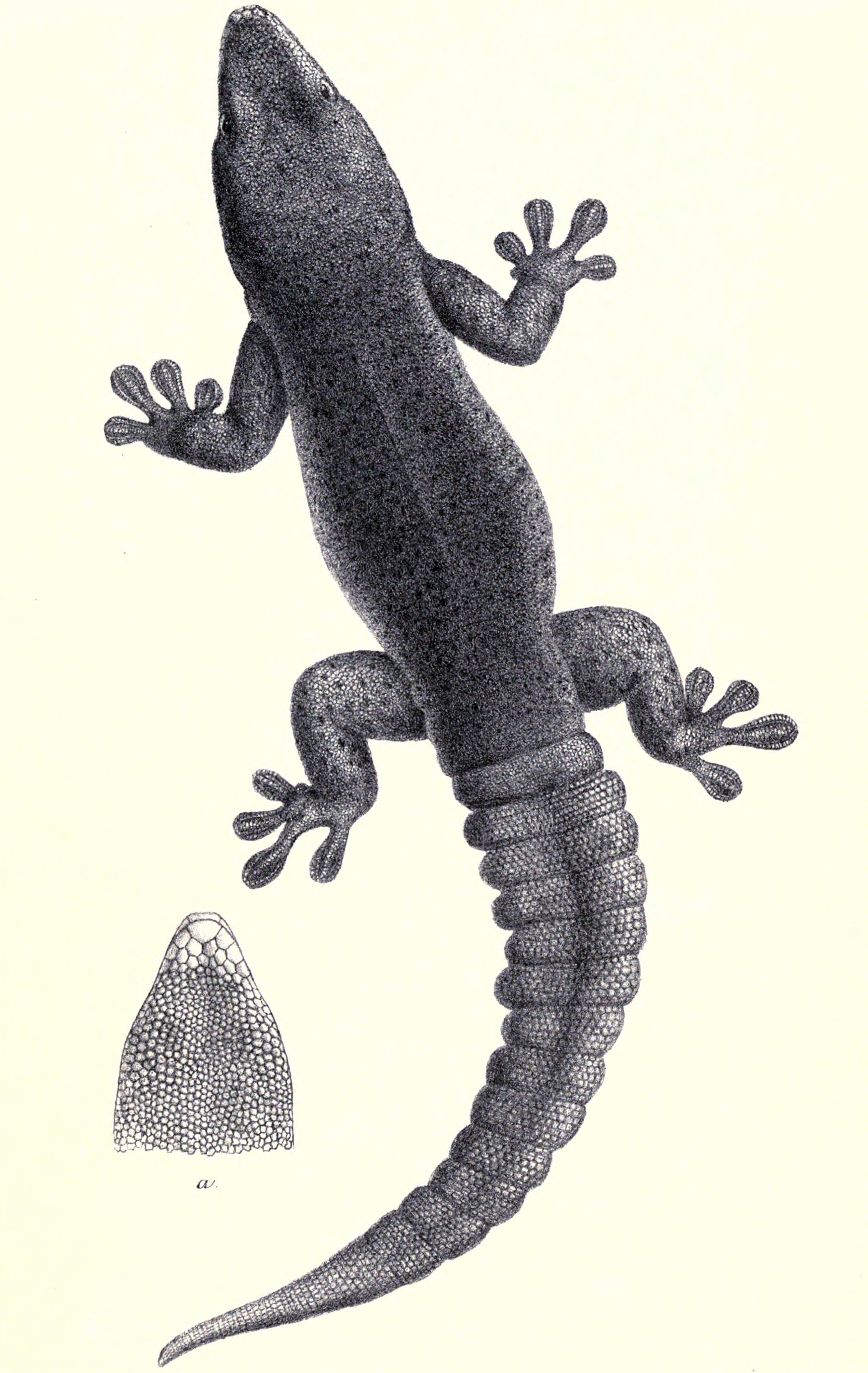
1885 illustration

The Rodrigues day gecko was originally described as Phelsuma newtoni by Boulenger in 1884, also spelt Phelsuma newtonii by Boulenger in 1885. However, because this scientific name was also used as a synonym for Phelsuma gigas, Vinson & Vinson changed the specific name to edwardnewtoni in 1969.

The specific name, edwardnewtoni, is in honor of British colonial administrator and ornithologist Edward Newton.

== Description ==
P. edwardnewtoni was one of the largest day geckos. It reached a total length (including tail) of about 23 cm (9.1 in). Earlier investigators describe the animal as being quite common. However, this species has not been sighted since 1917, in spite of thorough searches in the 1960s and 1970s on Rodrigues and all offshore islets. Today, only six preserved specimens remain, which are in The Natural History Museum in London and the Paris Natural History Museum. These specimens have been preserved in alcohol and show a thick-bodied, robust Phelsuma. The body colour in life has been described as bright green with bright blue spots on the backside. The underside of the tail was whitish-yellow. The chin had a deep yellow colour.

== Behaviour and ecology ==
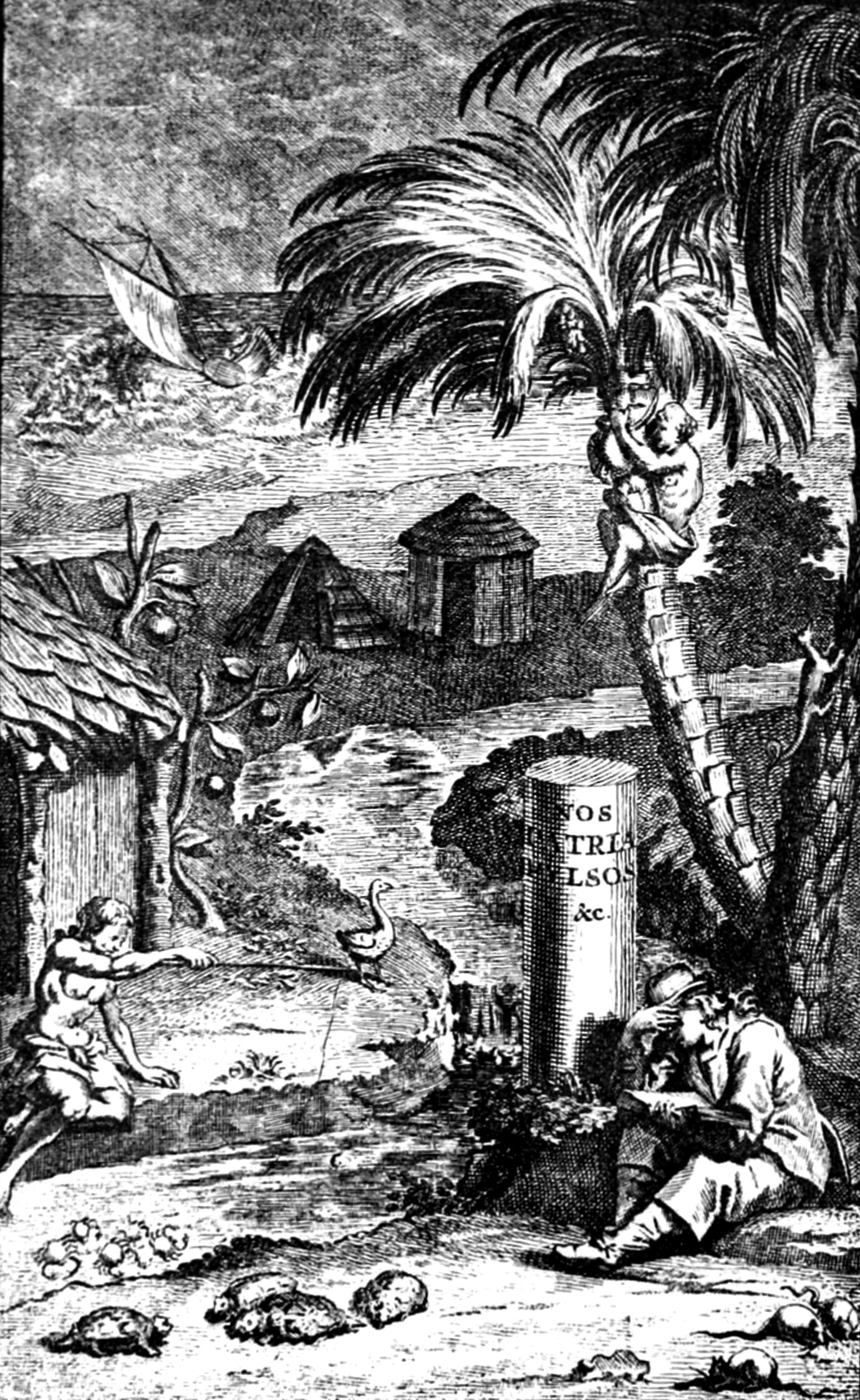
Frontispiece to Leguat's 1708 memoir, showing his settlement on Rodrigues; a gecko can be seen in the palm-tree

The species P. edwardnewtoni inhabited Rodrigues Island and its surrounding islets. P. edwardnewtoni was observed on coconut trees and other palms. Its habitat has been largely destroyed by humans and introduced animals such as cats and rats, which may have been the main cause of its extinction.

This day gecko fed mainly on palm fruit, and various insects and other invertebrates associated with palm trees. It also liked to lick soft, sweet fruit, pollen and nectar.

P. edwardnewtoni was documented as being unafraid of humans. It was quite tame and would even eat fruit from one's hand. Leguat described the behaviour as follows:

The Palmtrees and Plantanes are always loaden with Lizards about a foot long, the Beauty of which is very Extraordinairy; some of them are blue, some black, some green, some red, some grey, and the colour of each the most lively and bright of any of its kind. Their common Food is the Fruit of the Palm-Trees. They are not mischievous, and so Tame, that they often come and eat the Melons on our Tables, and in our Presence, and even in our Hands; they serve for Prey to some Birds, specially the Bitterns. When we beat 'em down from the Trees with a Pole, these Birds wou'd come and devour them before us, tho' we did our utmost to hinder them; and when we offered to oppose them, they came on still after their Prey, and still followed us when we endeavoured to defend them.

It can also be noted that the behavior of this species was most likely very similar to other island dwelling day geckos such as the Madagascar giant day gecko (Phelsuma grandis) and Standing's day gecko (P. standingi) which share a very similar niche as this species.

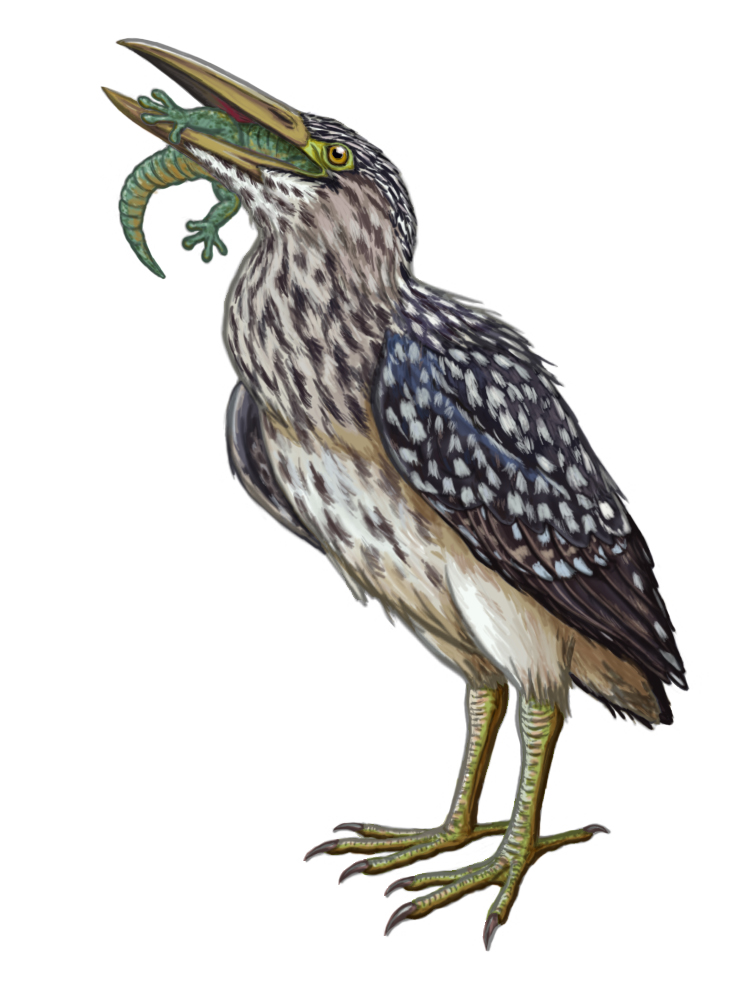
Restoration of a Rodrigues night heron (Nycticorax megacephalus) eating a Rodrigues day gecko, based on contemporary accounts, remains, and related species. Both species are now extinct.
