= Ascension night heron =

Conservation status
- Extinct (IUCN 3.1)

Scientific classification
- Domain: Eukaryota
- Kingdom: Animalia
- Phylum: Chordata
- Class: Aves
- Order: Pelecaniformes
- Family: Ardeidae
- Genus: Nycticorax
- Species: †N. olsoni

Binomial name
- †Nycticorax olsoni Bourne, Ashmole & Simmons, 2003

Extinct species of bird

The Ascension night heron (Nycticorax olsoni) is an extinct night heron species from the genus Nycticorax endemic to the South Atlantic island of Ascension. It is predominantly known from the bone fragments of six specimens found in guano deposits and caves on Ascension Island and described by Philip Ashmole, Kenneth Edwin Laurence Ryder Simmons, and William Richmond Postle Bourne in 2003.

The Ascension night heron disappeared in the 16th century. Its scientific name commemorates Storrs L. Olson.

A possible report on the Ascension night heron is found in the chapter "D'une isle nommte I'Ascention" in the travel report Les singularitez de la France antarctique by André Thévet. Given that Thévet alludes to a flightless bird named Aponar in 1555, it could be quite possible that he was referring to the Ascension night heron. The English translation of Thévet's notice about the Aponar (sometimes also written Aponat or Aponard) is stated as:

Furthermore in this island there is a certain kind of great birds that I have heard called Aponars; they have little wings, and therefore they cannot fly. They are great and high like herons, the belly white and the back black as coal, the bill like to a cormorant; when they are killed they cry like hogs.

It is known that Thévet is not entirely reliable and sometimes invented animals or other details. The name "aponard" is attested by Jacques Cartier, who used it for the great auk in a report on a Northwest Atlantic expedition a few years earlier. No great auk or similar bones could be found on Ascension; they are rather heavy for bird bones, the great auk having been a large flightless species adapted to diving and certainly would preserve better than those of a Nycticorax. Considering this and biogeography, it is as good as certain that Thévet cannot have seen the same bird as Cartier encountered on the Great Banks.

Cartier's reports aroused considerable interest among the educated French around 1550, and it is quite likely that Thévet himself had read them and that they were his source for the name. Whether Thévet invented his "aponar" in yet another attempt to make his book more interesting - as he was wont to - or whether his testimony is in fact a description of the Nycticorax is hard to decide. Cartier's description is vague and Thévet had almost certainly not seen an actual great auk by 1558; his description may equally well apply to either that bird or a Nycticorax, though some details - the comparison with herons or the voice - seem to fit the Ascension night heron better than the great auk.
