= Edward Newton =

British colonial administrator and ornithologist

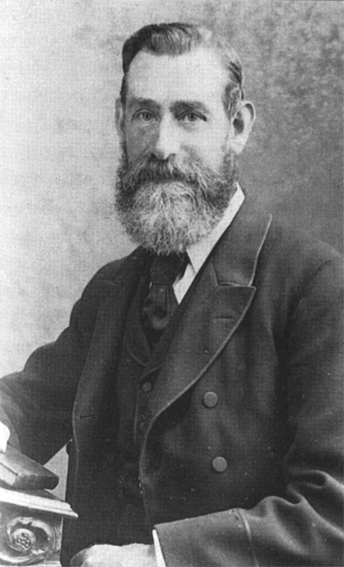
- Born: 10 November 1832; Elveden, Suffolk, England
- Died: 25 April 1897 (aged 64); Lowestoft, Suffolk, England

Sir Edward Newton KCMG (10 November 1832 – 25 April 1897) was a British colonial administrator and ornithologist.

He was born at Elveden Hall, Suffolk the sixth and youngest son of William Newton, MP. He was the brother of ornithologist Alfred Newton. He graduated from Magdelene College, Cambridge in 1857 and was one of the twenty founding members of the British Ornithologists' Union.

Newton was the Colonial Secretary for Mauritius from 1859 to 1877. From there he sent his brother a number of specimens, including the dodo and the Rodrigues solitaire, both already extinct.

In 1878, Newton initiated the first laws anywhere specifically designed to protect indigenous land birds from persecution.

Edward was later Colonial Secretary and Lieutenant-Governor of Jamaica (1877–1883). He married Mary Louisa Cranstoun, daughter of W.W.R. Kerr in 1869. She died the following year.

He is commemorated in the binomial of the Malagasy kestrel, Falco newtoni.

Phelsuma edwardnewtoni, a species of gecko, is named in his honour.

== Bibliography ==
- Newton, Edward (1869). "On the osteology of the Solitaire or Didine bird of the Island of Rodriguez, Pezophaps solitaria (Gmel.)". Philosophical Transactions of the Royal Society of London. 159: 327–362. OCLC 1051573674 (all editions).
- Newton, Edward; Gadow, Hans (1893). "On additional bones of the dodo and other extinct birds of Mauritius obtained by Mr. Théodore Sauzier". Transactions of the Zoological Society of London. 13 (7): 281–302. doi:10.1111/j.1469-7998.1893.tb00001.x. OCLC 223347505 (all editions). (with five plates)
