= François Leguat =

French explorer and naturalist (1637/1639 – 1735)

- Born: 1637/1639
- Died: September 1735 (aged about 97); London
- Known for: Observations on the now extinct fauna of Rodrigues (Indian Ocean)
- Scientific career
- Fields: Zoology, exploration

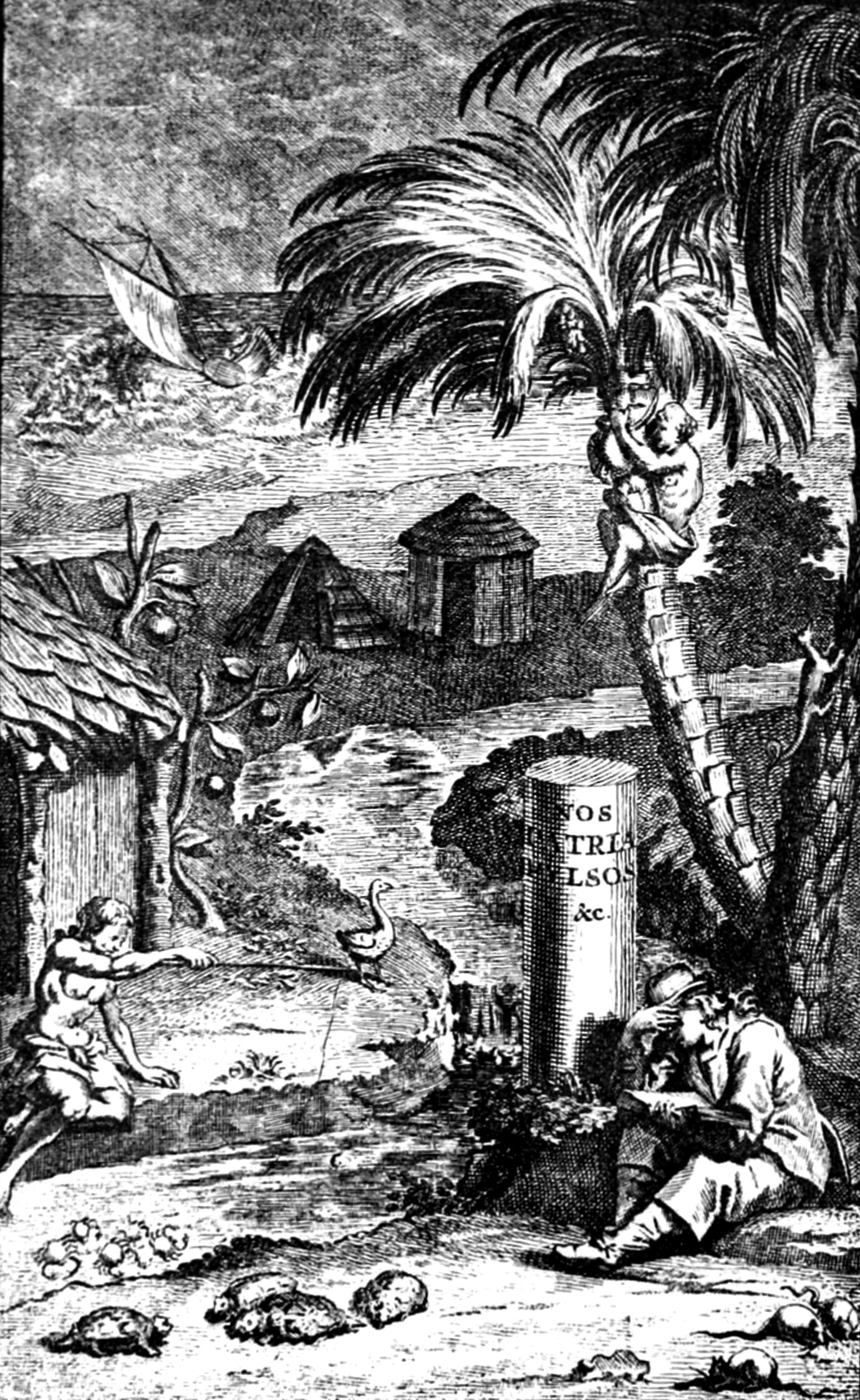
The frontispiece of the French edition of François Leguat's book published in 1708.

François Leguat (1637/1639 – September 1735) was a French explorer and naturalist. He was one of a small group of male French Protestant refugees who in 1691 settled on the uninhabited island of Rodrigues in the western Indian Ocean. The colonists became discontented with their life on the island and after a stay of two years managed to escape to Mauritius in a small boat. Leguat arrived back in Europe in June 1698 and wrote a book recounting his adventures which was published in 1708. In his book Leguat describes several species of birds and tortoises that were endemic to Rodrigues but are now extinct.

== Life ==
François Leguat was a French Huguenot originating from the province of Bresse, now part of the department of Ain, who fled to Holland in 1689 after the revocation of the Edict of Nantes in 1685. Marquis Henri du Quesne had published a book giving a glowing description of the island of Réunion and, with the cooperation of the Dutch East India Company, was planning to establish a colony of French Protestant refugees on the island. Two ships were charted for the purpose, and many refugees, including Leguat, were eager to become colonists, but when du Quesne learned that France had sent a squadron of ships to the island, he abandoned this plan as he wanted to avoid any confrontation with the French. Instead he fitted out a small frigate, L'Hirondelle, and instructed the captain, Anthony Valleau, to reconnoitre the Mascarene Islands and to take possession of whatever island was found unoccupied and suitable for colonisation. It appears that the colonists were not informed of this change of plan. On 10 July 1690 Leguat and nine male volunteers boarded L'Hirondelle in Amsterdam, intending to start a new life on the island of Réunion, which they believed had been abandoned by the French. Instead, on 16 May 1691, Leguat and seven companions were marooned on the uninhabited island of Rodrigues.

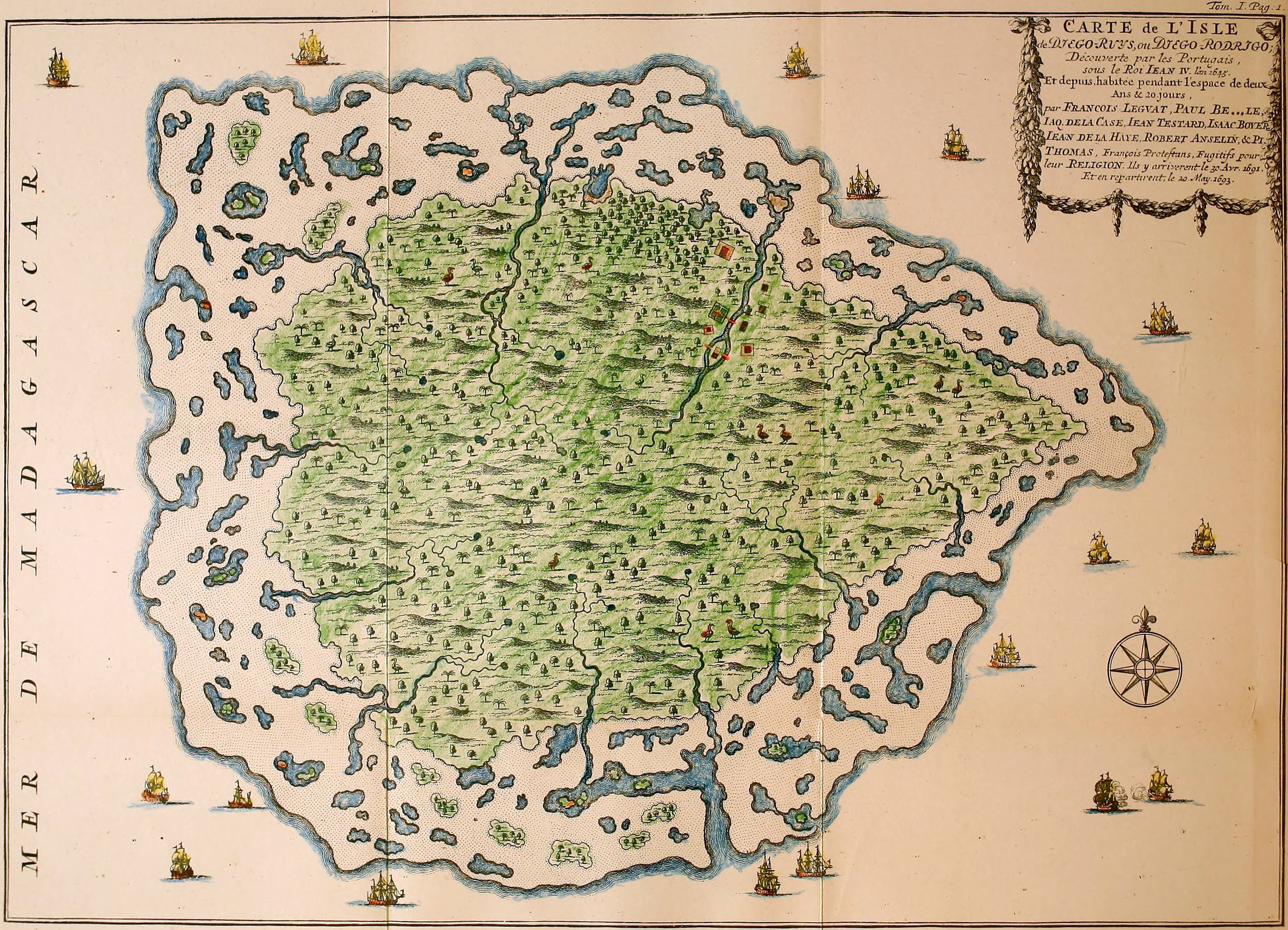
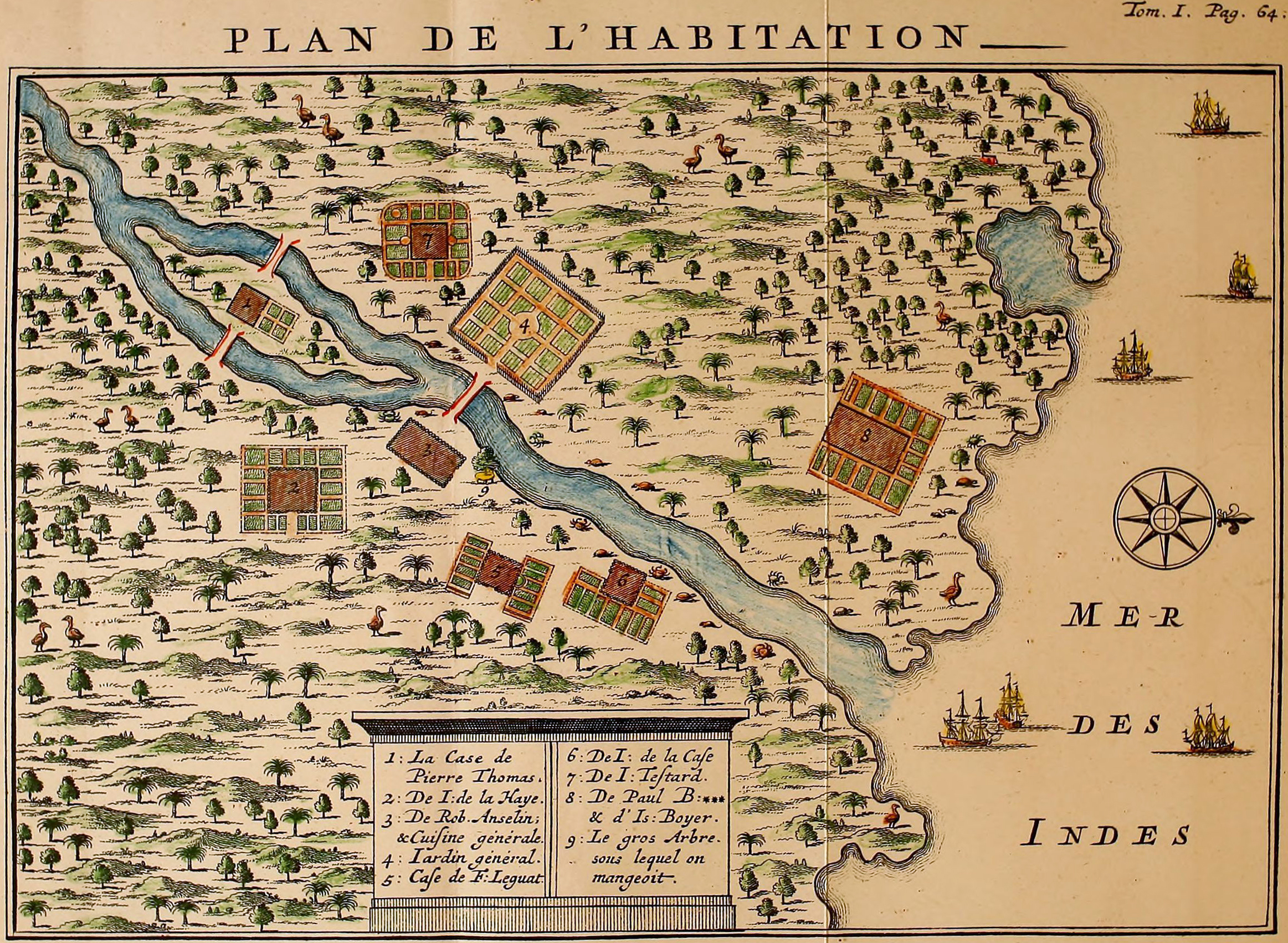
Leguat's 1708 maps of Rodrigues and his settlement. Rodrigues solitaires are distributed across the maps

After spending a year on the island the group became homesick and set about constructing a wooden boat to allow them to escape to Mauritius, then under Dutch control. The first attempt failed when they struck Rodrigues' reef; one of the party subsequently died from some illness (possibly brought about by contact with some poisonous reef fauna). They finally left Rodrigues on 21 May 1693 and spent a week being carried by the prevailing wind and current in their open boat to Mauritius, a distance of 300 nautical miles (560 km).

They were initially well received by the governor of the island, Rodolfo Diodati, but after an argument over a piece of ambergris that one of the group had brought from Rodrigues, and the discovery by Diodati of their plan to steal a dinghy and escape to Réunion, five of the party were put in prison. Relations were probably strained by the fact that France and Holland were on opposite sides in the Nine Years' War (1688–97). In February 1694 they were transferred to a tiny islet some distance from the shore and kept under abhorrent conditions. One of the group died in attempting to escape; he seems to have reached Mauritius' mainland with a crude float, but apparently perished in the woods too. Finally, in September 1696 the remaining members of the group were transferred to Batavia and brought before the Dutch Council where they were found to be innocent. Leguat and the two other survivors arrived back in Europe in June 1698. Leguat appears to have settled in England and spent the rest of his life there. He died in September 1735 in London.

== Works ==
Leguat published a description of his adventures in 1708 when he was around 70 years old. The full French title is: Voyage et avantures de François Leguat et de ses compagnons, en deux isles désertes des Indes orientales : avec la relation des choses les plus remarquables qu'ils ont observées dans l'isle Maurice, à Batavia, au Cap de Bon Espérance, dans l'isle de Sainte Hélène, et en d'autres endroits de leur route. Le tout enrichi de cartes et de figures. The French edition was published in both London and Amsterdam. An English translation with the title A New Voyage to the East-Indies was published in London and a Dutch edition in Utrecht. Some of the text is very similar to passages found in works by Maximilien Misson, another French Huguenot living in exile. It appears that either Leguat copied Misson or, more likely, Misson assisted Leguat with the book and wrote the preface.

The book is notable in containing Leguat's natural history observations on the now extinct fauna of Rodrigues including the Rodrigues solitaire, the Rodrigues rail, the domed and the saddle-backed Rodrigues giant tortoises and Newton's parakeet.

== Sources ==
- Du Quesne, Henri (1887), Un projet de république à l'île d'Éden (l'île Bourbon) en 1689, Preface by Théodore Sauzier, Paris: E. Dufossé.
- Leguat, François (1708), Voyage et avantures de François Leguat & de ses compagnons en deux isles desertes des Indes Orientales. (2 Volumes), Amsterdam: J.-L. de Lorme. Full text of Vol. 1 and Vol. 2 at Google Books. Full text of Vol. 2 at Gallica.
- Le Guat, François (1708), A New Voyage to the East-Indies by Francis Leguat and His Companions, London: Bonwicke et al.
- Leguat, François (1891), The voyage of François Leguat of Bresse, to Rodriguez, Mauritius, Java, and the Cape of Good Hope. (2 Volumes), Edited and annotated by Samuel Pasfield Oliver, London: Hakluyt Society. Transcribed from the first 1708 English translation. Full text of Vol. 1 and Vol. 2 at Internet Archive (which has other scans available).
- Oliver, Samuel Pasfield (1891), "Introduction", The voyage of François Leguat of Bresse, to Rodriguez, Mauritius, Java, and the Cape of Good Hope., vol. 1, London: Hakluyt Society, pp. xvii–lv.
- Bibliothèque Britannique, ou histoire des ouvrages des savans de la Grande-Bretagne (in French), vol. 5, La Haye: Pierre de Hondt, 1735.
