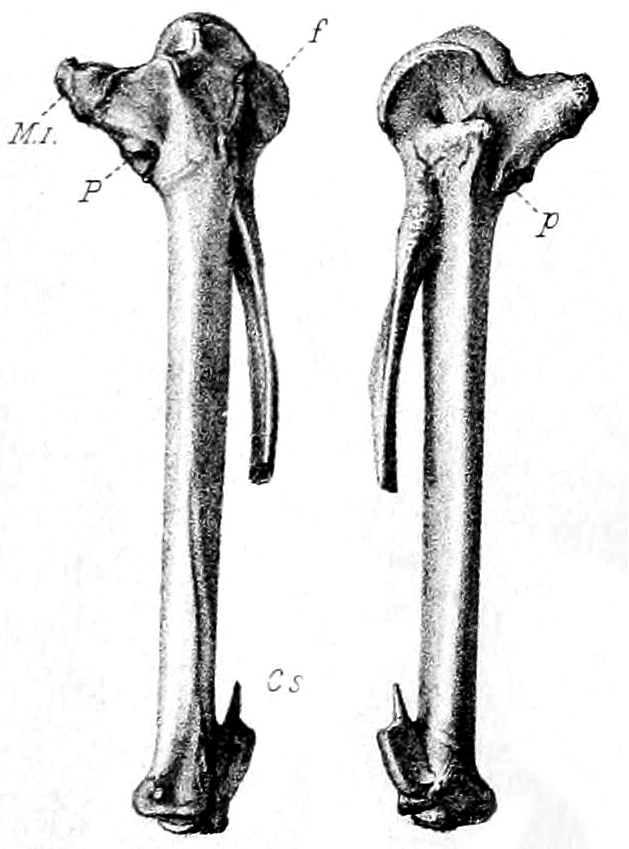
- 1893 illustrations of the first known carpometacarpus wing-bone

Conservation status
- Extinct (1698) (IUCN 3.1)

Scientific classification
- Kingdom: Animalia
- Phylum: Chordata
- Class: Aves
- Order: Anseriformes
- Family: Anatidae
- Genus: Alopochen
- Species: †A. mauritiana

Binomial name
- †Alopochen mauritiana (Newton & Gadow, 1893)
- Location of Mauritius

Synonyms
- Sarcidiornis mauritianus Newton & Gadow, 1893

= Mauritius sheldgoose =

Extinct species of bird

The Mauritius sheldgoose (Alopochen mauritiana), also known as the Mauritius shelduck, is an extinct species of sheldgoose that was endemic to the island of Mauritius. While geese were mentioned by visitors to Mauritius in the 17th century, few details were provided by these accounts. In 1893, a carpometacarpus wing-bone and a pelvis from the Mare aux Songes swamp were used to name a new species of comb duck, Sarcidiornis mauritianus. These bones were connected to the contemporary accounts of geese and later determined to belong to a species related to the Egyptian goose and placed in the sheldgoose genus Alopochen. The Mauritius and Réunion sheldgoose may have descended from Egyptian geese that colonised the Mascarene Islands.

One contemporary account states that the Mauritius sheldgoose had wings that were half black and half white, and that the bird was not very large. The species may also be depicted in one illustration. Fossil elements show that it was smaller than the Egyptian goose, but with more robust legs. Little is known about the habits of the Mauritius sheldgoose, accounts indicate they were very tame, were grazers, lived in groups, and usually stayed on the north side of the island except for during the dry season when they were forced to the other side to drink. Their robust legs indicate they were becoming more terrestrial, which is supported by accounts stating they avoided water. The species was considered highly palatable by travellers, and while abundant in 1681, it declined quickly thereafter, being declared extinct in 1698. It was probably driven to extinction due to overhunting and predation by introduced animals, particularly cats.

== Taxonomy ==
Geese were reported by visitors to the Mascarene island of Mauritius in the 17th century, but few details were provided by these accounts. In 1889, the Mauritius government requested exploration of the Mare aux Songes swamp for "historical souvenirs", where vast amounts of dodo remains had earlier been found. The new excavations, under the direction of the French naturalist Théodore Sauzier, were successful, and apart from dodo bones, subfossil remains of other extinct animals, previously known as well as new species, were found. These bones were sent to the Cambridge Museum, where they were examined and described by the British ornithologist Edward Newton and the German ornithologist Hans Gadow in 1893. Based on a left carpometacarpus wing-bone (part of the hand, and the holotype specimen), they determined the existence of a large member of the comb duck genus Sarcidiornis, which they considered a new species due to having been restricted to Mauritius, naming it S. mauritianus. They also considered the incomplete left half of a pelvis to belong to this species.

Because the contemporary accounts of geese on Mauritius did not mention a caruncle (or knob) on their bill as is seen in Sarcidiornis comb geese, the French zoologist Emile Oustalet doubted they belonged in that genus in 1896. When describing the Malagasy sheldgoose (then Chenalopex sirabensis, now in the genus Alopochen) based on fossils from Madagascar in 1897, the British palaeontologist Charles William Andrews suggested that when more remains were discovered of the Mauritian species, the two might turn out to be the same. While the British zoologist Walter Rothschild noted Oustalet's objection to the species belonging in Sarcidiornis In 1907, he believed that it was merely an oversight that the caruncle was not mentioned in contemporary accounts, and that an allusion to the small size of these geese supported them being Sarcidiornis. The American ornithologist James Greenway listed the bird as a species of Sarcidiornis in 1967.

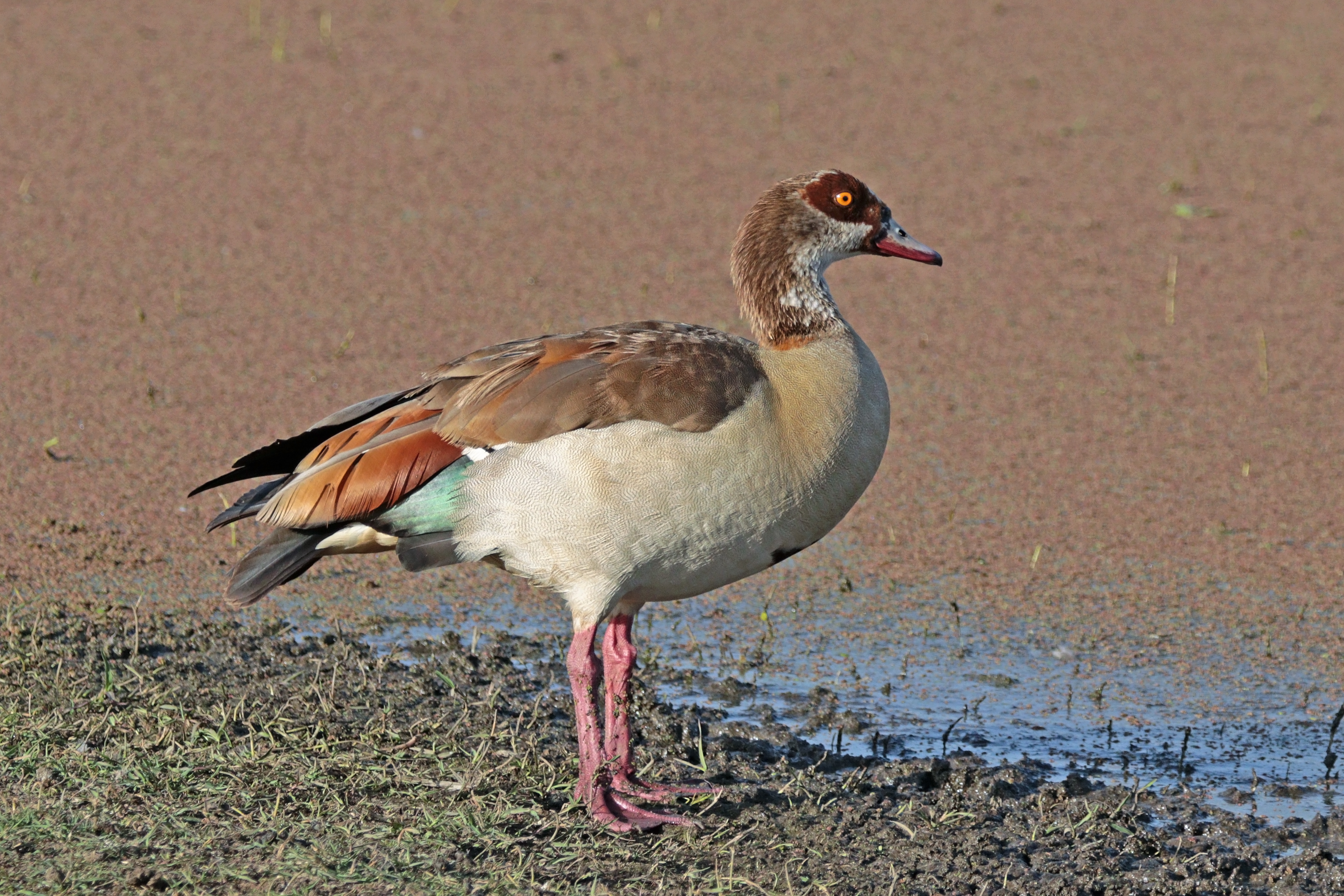
The related Egyptian goose

In 1987, the British ornithologist Graham S. Cowles stated that an additional carpometacarpus from the Mare aux Songes then recently identified in the British Museum of Natural History confirmed Andrews' suggestion that the Mauritius bird did not belong in Sarcidiornis, but in the sheldgoose (or shelduck) genus Alopochen, to which the extant Egyptian goose (A. aegyptiaca) belonged. In his 1994 description of the Réunion sheldgoose (then Mascarenachen kervazoi) based on fossils from Réunion, Cowles again listed the Mauritius bird as A. mauritiana, noting that Andrews had implied it was close to the Malagasy sheldgoose. In 1997, the British ornithologists Hywel Glyn Young, Simon J. Tonge, and Julian P. Hume reviewed extinct wildfowl, and noted that the interrelationships of the four extinct sheldgeese from the region of Madagascar and the western Indian Ocean were unclear, and that they may not all have been full species. They also listed the Mauritius sheldgoose as a species of Alopochen.

The French palaeontologist Cécile Mourer-Chauviré and colleagues stated in 1999 that while the Mauritius sheldgoose was similar to the Malagasy and Réunion sheldgeese, it may have been endemic to Mauritius, and may be distinguishable from those species if more remains of it are found. They also moved the Réunion sheldgoose to the same genus as the Egyptian goose and the Mauritius sheldgoose, Alophochen. The British writer Errol Fuller stated in 2000 that while the geese seen on Mauritius by 17th century travellers may be connected to the species described from bones, it is possible that there is no connection. The British ecologist Anthony S. Cheke and Hume suggested in 2008 that the Mascarene sheldgeese were derived from Malagasy forms with African affinities, probably descended from the Egyptian goose after it had colonised the Mascarene islands. They added that fossils of the Mauritius sheldgoose were "extremely rare". In 2013, Hume noted that the first known tarsometatarsus (a lower leg bone) of the Mauritius sheldgoose was collected from the Mare aux Songes in 2006, and that he had reidentified a radius (a forelimb bone) as that of the sheldgoose, which had originally been assigned to the Mauritius night heron by Newton and Gadow in 1893.

Reflecting changing historical classifications and definitions, the Mauritius sheldgoose has also been referred to by common names such as Mauritius shelduck and Mascarene swan, with further variations such as Mauritian shelduck and Mascarene sheldgoose.

== Description ==
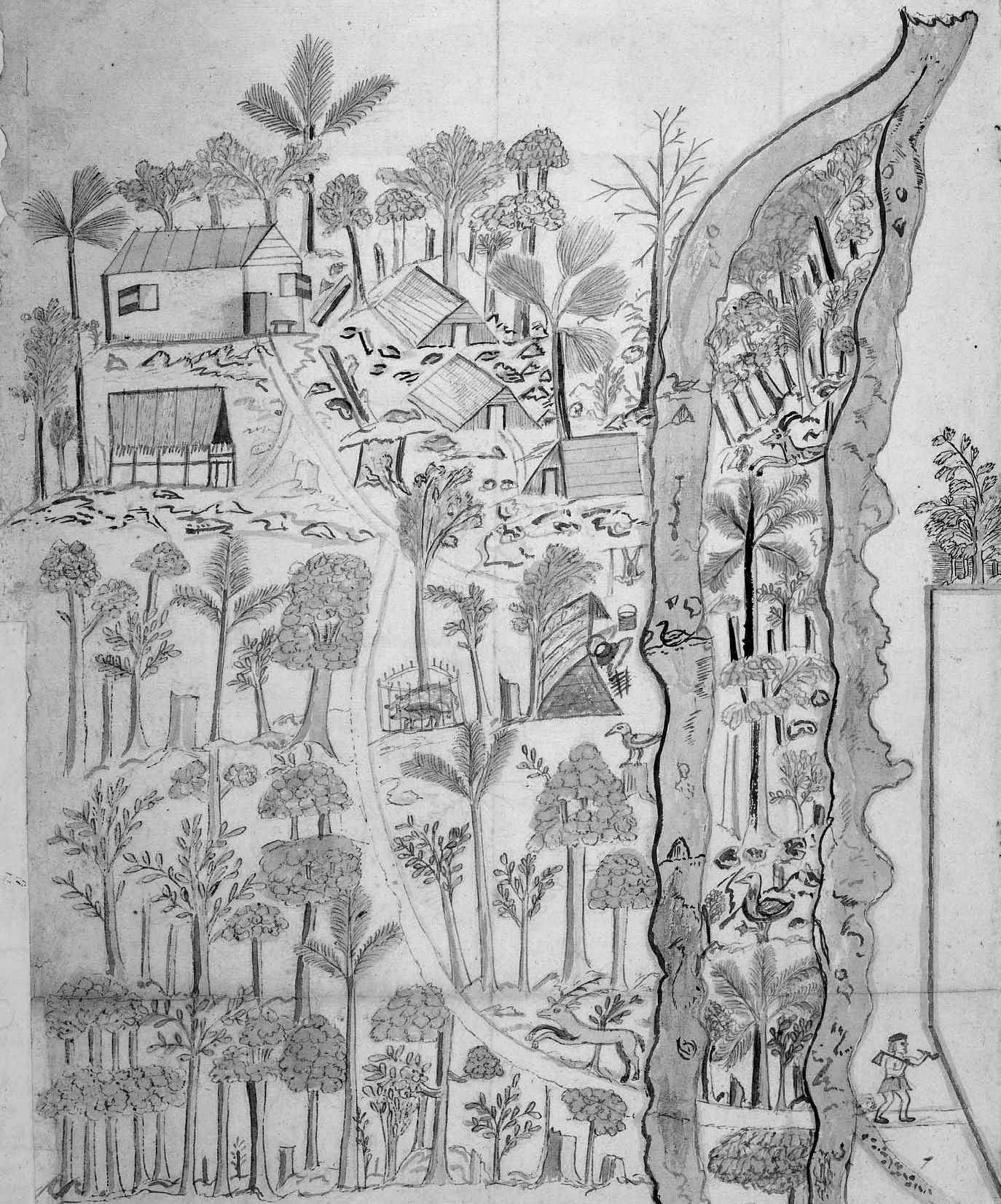
Illustration of a Dutch farm on Mauritius from 1670, which may include the only contemporary depiction of a Mauritius sheldgoose (between the streams, lower middle right)

The best contemporary description of the Mauritius sheldgoose, and the only one that indicates what it looked like, is that of the English traveller John Marshall from 1668:

Here are many geese, the halfe of their wings towards the end, are black, and the other halfe white. They are not large but fat and good [to eat].

The holotype carpometacarpus of the Mauritius sheldgoose has a strongly projecting alular metacarpal (the hand bone to which the alula feathers attach) which ends in a callosity (with a rough and irregular surface). The length of the carpometacarpus is 77 mm (3.0 in), within the size range of the Malagasy sheldgoose, and slightly larger than the largest individual of the Réunion sheldgoose. The carpometacarpus is similar in size to that of the brant goose (Branta bernicla), but considerably smaller than that of the domestic goose (Anser anser domesticus). There is no evidence that the Mauritius sheldgoose and its extinct island relatives were flightless.

Additional fossil elements show that the Mauritius sheldgoose was smaller than the Egyptian goose, but with more robust legs, a feature it had in common with the Réunion sheldgoose. The pelvis of the Mauritius sheldgoose is also similar in size to that of the brant goose, measuring 70 mm (2.8 in) from the front brim of the acetabulum (the socket in the hip where the femur attaches) to the hind end of the ischium (which forms the back part of the pelvis), and generally agrees with the pelvis of ducks and geese. While the bill of the Mauritius sheldgoose is unknown, that of the Réunion sheldgoose was distinct in being shorter than that of the Egyptian goose.

=== Possible depiction ===
In 2004, Cheke attempted to identify a drawing of a bird that had been declared a dodo by the British historian Richard Grove in a 1995 book about western colonisation of oceanic islands. The bird was depicted in an illustration of a Dutch farm at Foul Bay, Mauritius, which showed agricultural practices, introduced animals, and birds and eels. Grove considered this to be the only illustration showing a dodo in its natural habitat and the last depiction of the species in life, and stated it was drawn by the commandant of the Dutch colony of Mauritius Isaac Lamotius in 1677. Grove believed that the drawing had been made to illustrate the overexploitation of the ebony forest to the Dutch East India Company, and that Lamotius had therefore been a sort of early conservationist.

Cheke, who had previously researched the history of the dodo, found no documentary or ornithological arguments for this identification, and expressed puzzlement over it and other of Grove's conclusions. After contacting the Dutch national archives, he established that the illustration was unsigned, but had been accompanied by a 1670 letter written by the previous commandant G. F. van Wreeden and H. Klingenbergh. Cheke pointed out that the supposed dodo had a short, deep bill, webbed feet, normal wings, and a short, upturned tail, features inconsistent with it being a dodo. He suggested it was instead a better fit for the Mauritius sheldgoose, which would therefore make it the only known contemporary illustration of this bird in life. The new identification also implied that the dodo was already extinct by 1670, though the drawing had been used to support it surviving longer than generally assumed. Cheke identified two other waterbirds depicted in a stream as possible Mascarene teals, and a crow-like bird as the extant Mauritius bulbul. Cheke and the British palaeontologist Jolyon C. Parish stated in 2020 that the illustration "almost certainly" showed the Mauritius sheldgoose.

== Behaviour and ecology ==
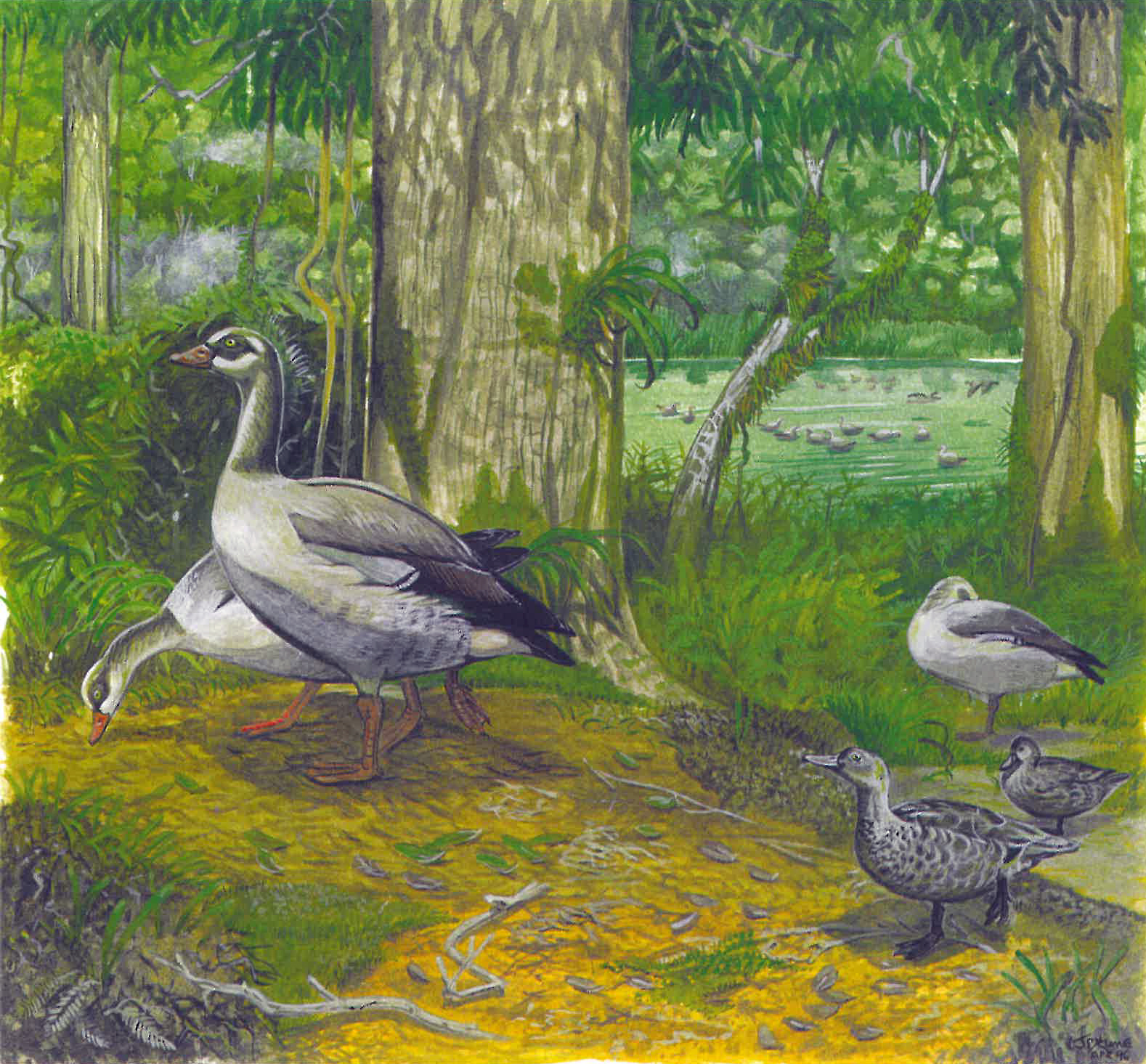
Life restoration of Mauritius sheldgeese (left) and Mascarene teals (lower right) by Julian P. Hume, 1996

Little is known about the habits of the Mauritius sheldgoose. The Dutch soldier Johannes Pretorius' 1660s report about his stay on Mauritius is the most detailed contemporary account of its behaviour:

Geese are also here in abundance. They are a little larger than ducks, very tame and stupid, seldom in the water, eating grass, sometimes 40 or 50 or even a 100 together. When they are being shot, the ones that are not hit by the hail stay put and do not fly away. They usually keep to the north side of the island, far away from where the people live, except in the dry season when they are forced to drink on the other side of the island, and sometimes near the lodge.

Hume and the British historian Ria Winters stated in 2015 that like many geese, the Mauritius sheldgoose was a grazer, and pointed out that Mauritius once had seven endemic species of grass, two of which are now extinct, as well as other species.

Hume suggested in 2017 that the relatively robust legs of the Mauritius sheldgoose may indicate it was becoming more terrestrial, supported by the 1681 ship's log of the British President which stated:

Up a little within the woods are several ponds and lakes of water with great numbers of flamingoes and gray teal and geese; but for the geese these are most in the woods or dry ponds.

Many other endemic species of Mauritius were lost after human colonisation of the island, so the ecosystem of the island is severely damaged and hard to conserve. Before humans arrived, Mauritius was entirely covered in forests, almost all of which have since been lost to deforestation. The surviving endemic fauna is still seriously threatened. The Mauritius sheldgoose lived alongside other recently extinct Mauritian birds such as the dodo, the red rail, the Mascarene teal, the broad-billed parrot, the Mascarene grey parakeet, the Mauritius blue pigeon, the Mauritius scops owl, the Mascarene coot, and the Mauritius night heron. Extinct Mauritian reptiles include the saddle-backed Mauritius giant tortoise, the domed Mauritius giant tortoise, the Mauritian giant skink, and the Round Island burrowing boa. The small Mauritian flying fox and the snail Tropidophora carinata lived on Mauritius and Réunion but became extinct in both islands. Some plants, such as Casearia tinifolia and the palm orchid, have also become extinct.

== Extinction ==
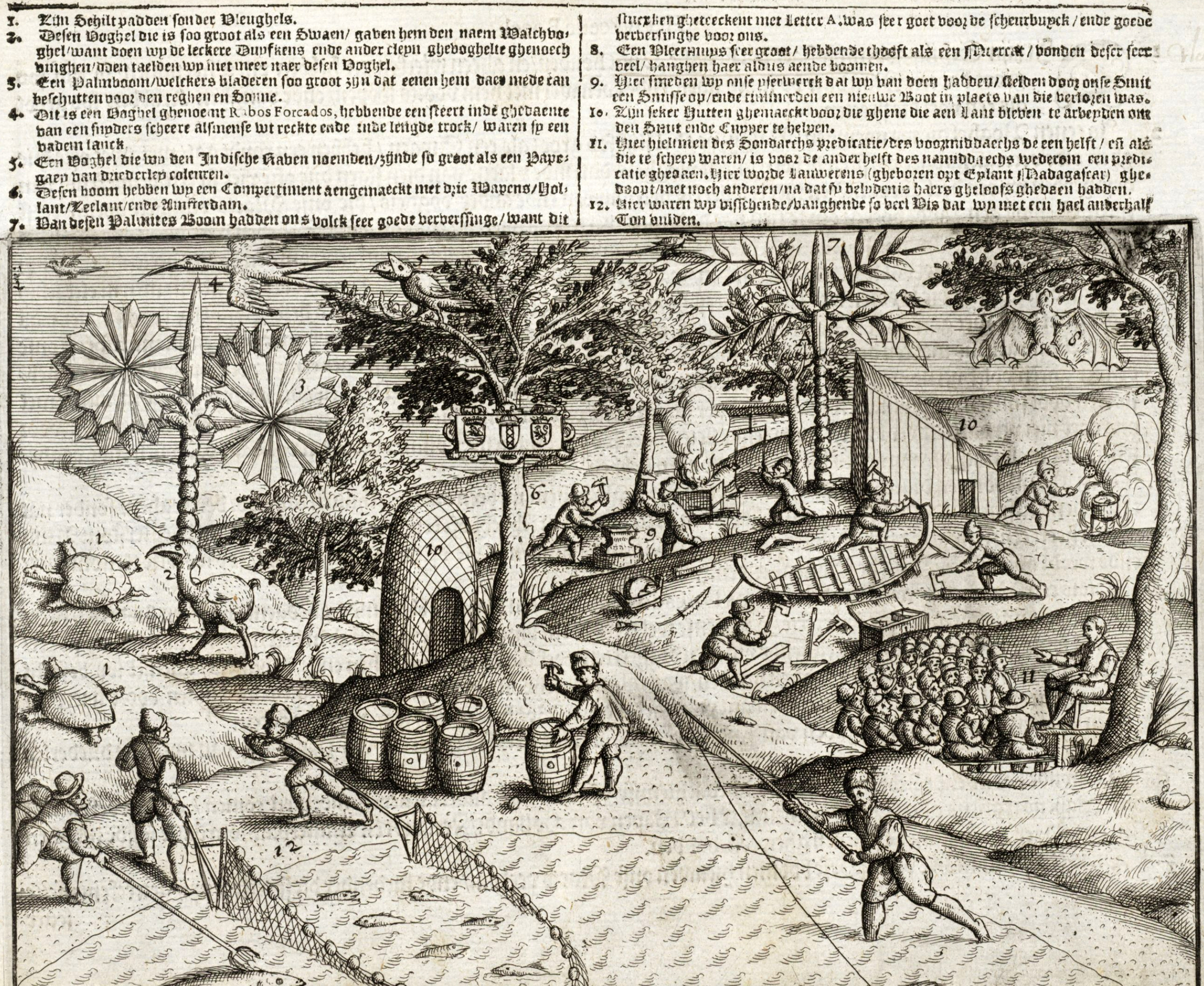
1601 engraving showing Dutch activities on the shore of Mauritius

Travellers to Mauritius and Réunion made repeat mentions of highly palatable geese and ducks, and these were listed among the favourite prey of hunters there. Cheke stated in 1987 that the Mauritius sheldgeese were considered abundant in 1681, but quickly declined thereafter; the French explorer François Leguat considered them rare in 1693, and the Dutch governor of Mauritius Roelof Deodati declared them extinct in 1698. Cheke added that since the number of men on these islands was low in the 1600s, it is unlikely they would have been responsible for the extinction of widespread animals, but those limited to certain habitats, like for example geese and ducks, may have been exterminated by hunting, though reduced breeding would probably be due to introduced animals.

Cheke and Hume suggested in 2008 that the introduction of cats to Mauritius possibly in the 1680s led to a rapid decline in ground-nesting birds, such as geese. Hume and the British ornithologist Michael Walters stated in 2012 that the Mauritius sheldgoose probably went extinct due to overhunting and possibly predation on its eggs and chicks by introduced predators. Cheke elaborated in 2013 that the main culprit was cats, with hunting being secondary, and the species survived introduced rats and pigs.
