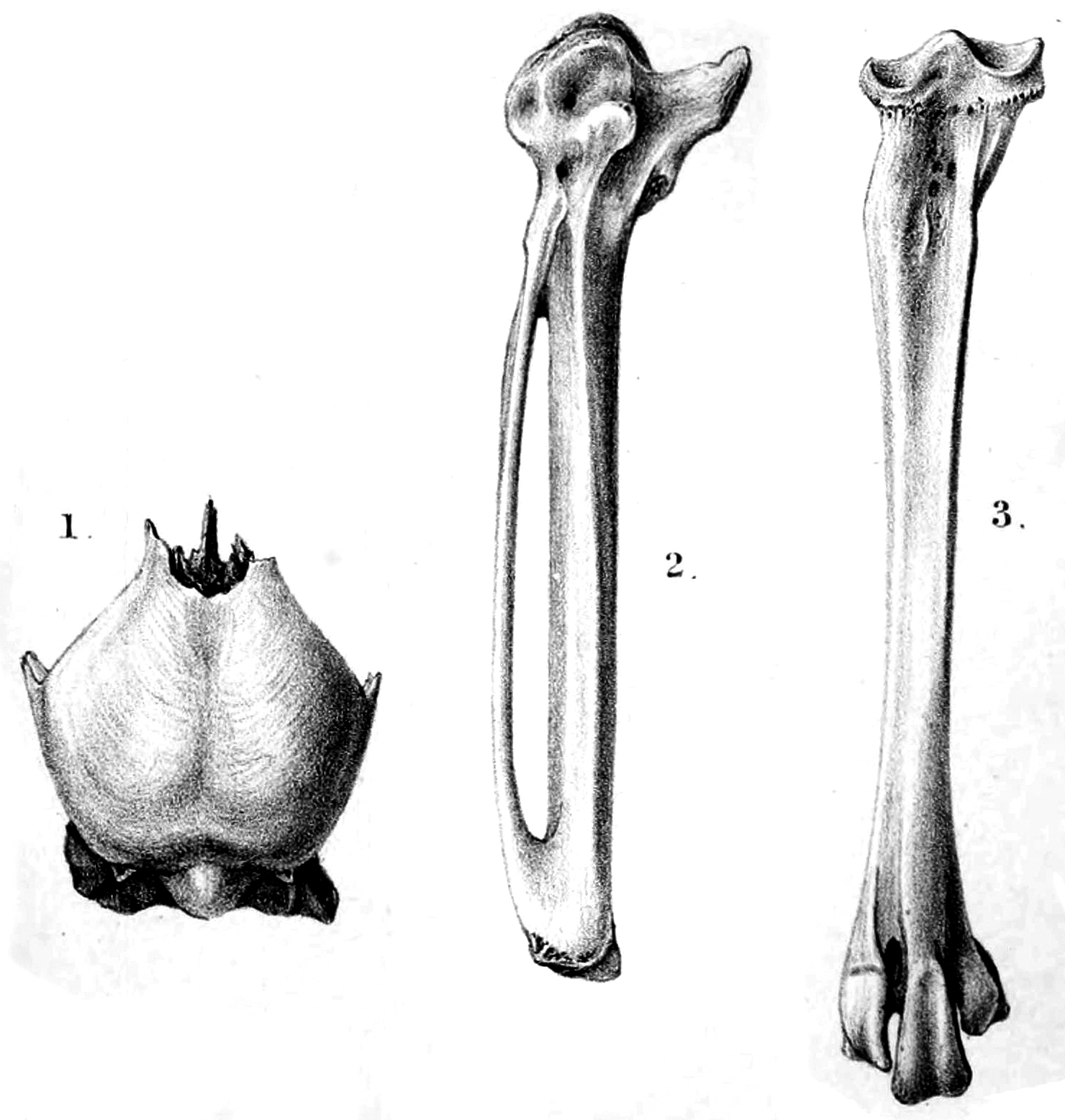
- Skull and limb fossils

Conservation status
- Extinct

Scientific classification
- Kingdom: Animalia
- Phylum: Chordata
- Class: Aves
- Order: Anseriformes
- Family: Anatidae
- Genus: Alopochen
- Species: †A. sirabensis

Binomial name
- †Alopochen sirabensis (Andrews, 1897)

Synonyms
- Chenalopex sirabensis Andrews

= Malagasy shelduck =

Malagasy shelduck Temporal range: Holocene

Extinct species of bird

The Malagasy shelduck (Alopochen sirabensis), also known as the Sirabe shelduck, is an extinct species of waterfowl in the shelduck subfamily, described from Late Pleistocene fossils found at Antsirabe in central Madagascar. It was related to the extant Egyptian goose, which is widespread in mainland Africa, and to the extinct Réunion and Mauritius shelducks from the Mascarene Islands.

The reason for the extinction of the Malagasy shelduck is unknown. Further findings in the Pleistocene sites of Ampasambazimba and Ampoza, and also in the Holocene site of Beloha (where remains were carbon dated to only 1380 ± 90 years BP, AD 480-660), show that the species was once widespread in Madagascar, inhabiting different biomes, and that it survived the arrival of humans to the island by about 500 years.
