= Mare aux Songes =

Swamp in south eastern Mauritius

Coordinates: 20.447°S 57.696°E

- Stratigraphic range: Holocene; ~0.0062–0.0004 Ma
- Type: Geological formation

Location
- Region: Africa
- Country: Mauritius
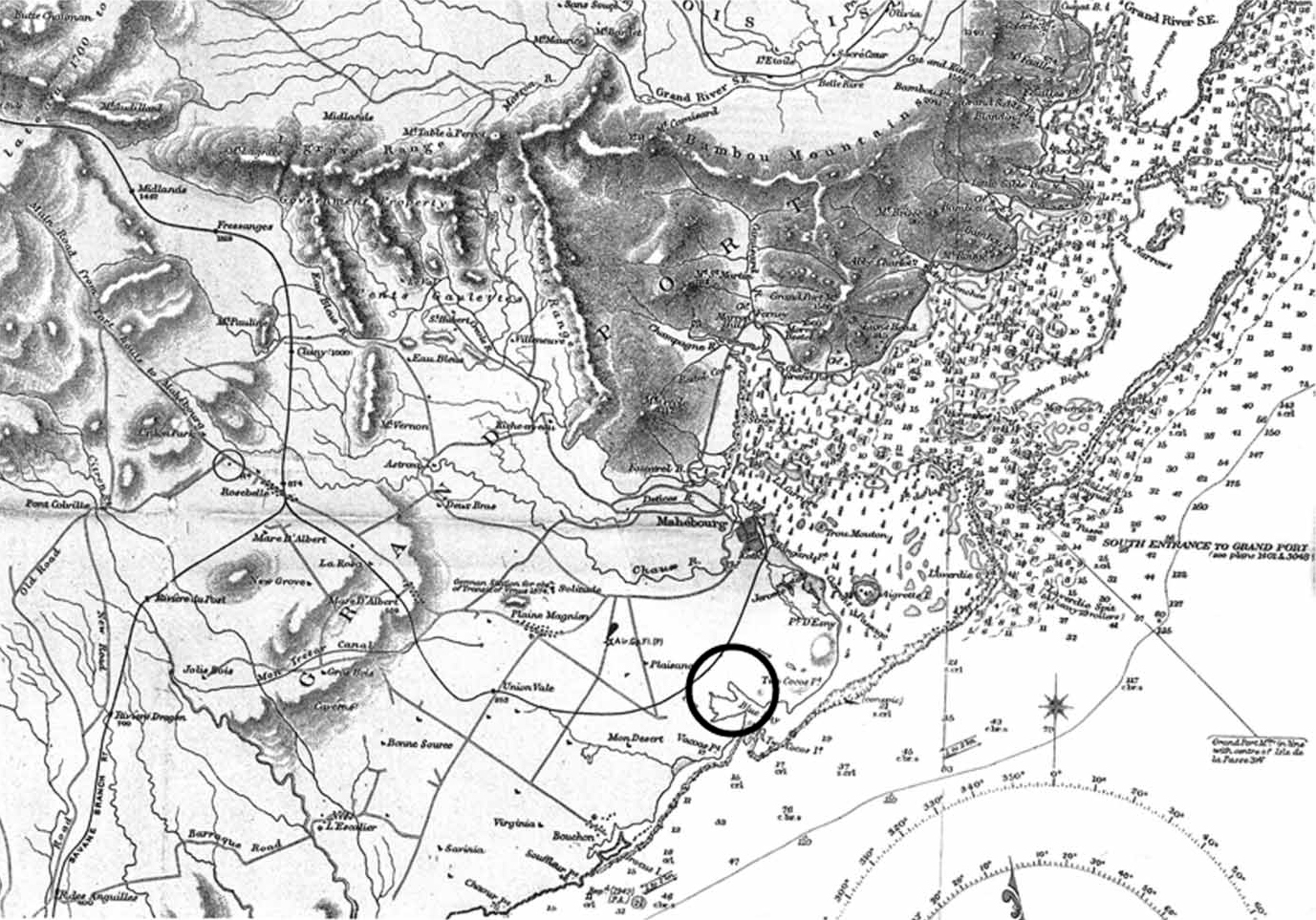
- Mare aux Songes encircled on a map of the Mauritian railway system in 1866

The Mare aux Songes (English: "pond of taro"; French: [ma.ʁ‿o sɔ̃ʒ]) swamp is a lagerstätte located close to the sea in south eastern Mauritius. Many subfossils of recently extinct animals have accumulated in the swamp, which was once a lake, and some of the first subfossil remains of dodos were found there.

== History ==
In 1865, a British railway engineer working in south-east Mauritius noticed bones that had been disturbed by workers digging peat. He showed his findings to the government schoolmaster at Mahébourg, George Clark, who subsequently uncovered an abundance of subfossil dodo bones in the swamp. Clark had been searching for thirty years, having been inspired by Strickland & Melville's monograph about the bird. In 1866, Clark explained his procedure to The Ibis, an ornithology journal:

After many fruitless visits to the spot... I resolved by sending some men into the centre of the marsh, where the water was about three feet deep and there, by feeling in the mud with their naked feet, they met with one entire tibia, a portion of another, and a tarso-metatarsus. The Dodo bones were imbedded only in the mud at the bottom of the water in the deepest part of the marsh... Encouraged by success, I employed several hands to search in the manner described, but I met with but few specimens of dodo bones till I thought of cutting away a mass of floating herbage nearly two feet in thickness, which covered the deepest part of the marsh. In the mud under this, I was rewarded by finding bones of many dodos.

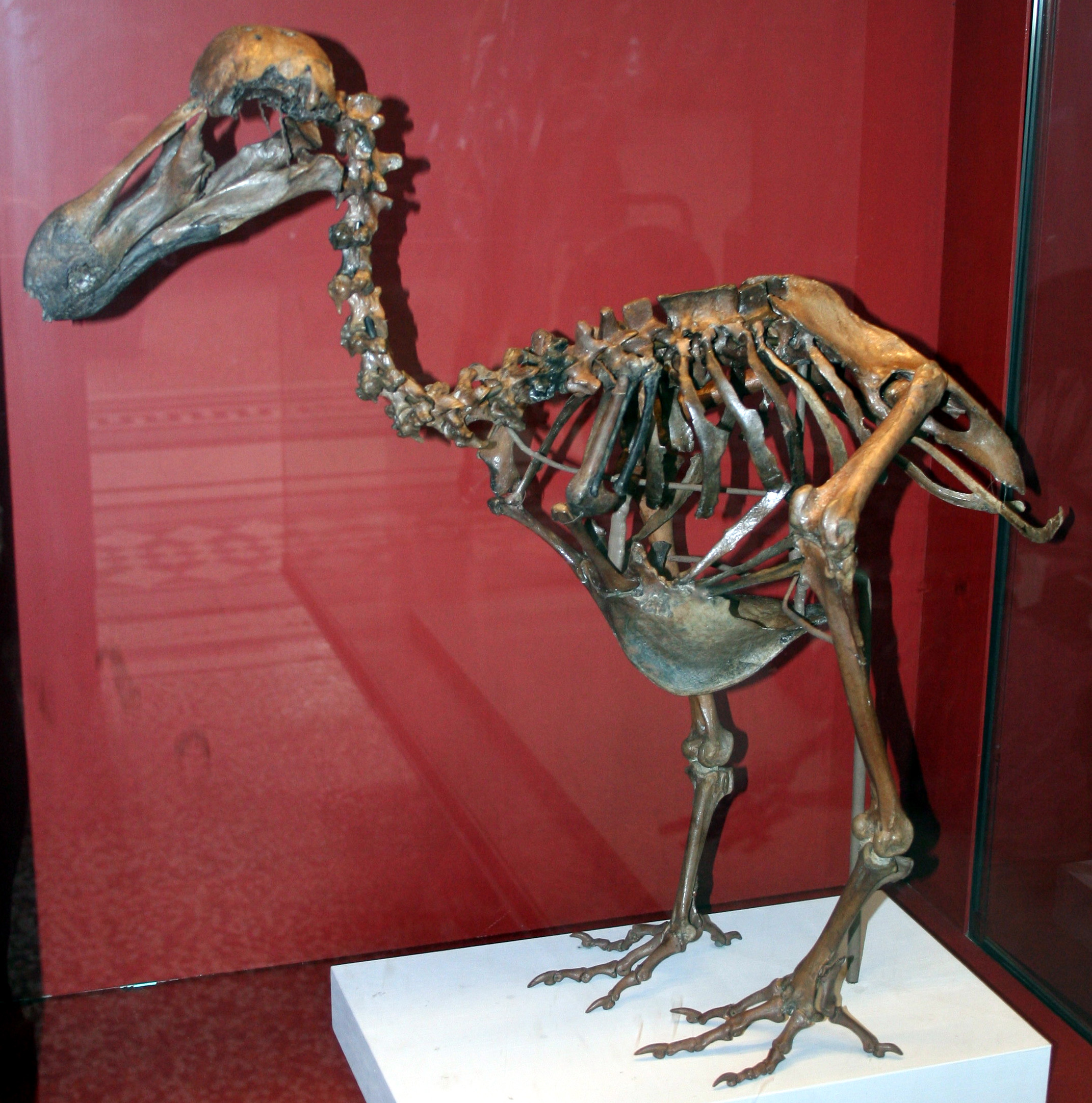
The dodo skeleton Richard Owen put together from bones found in the Mare aux Songes

Remains of over 300 dodos were found in the swamp, but only very few skull and wing bones among them, which may be explained by the upper bodies having been washed away or scavenged while the lower body was trapped, which is similar to the way many moa remains have been found in New Zealand marshes. In 1889, Théodor Sauzier was commissioned to find more dodo remains in the Mare aux Songes. He was successful, and also found remains of other extinct species. Twenty-six museums worldwide have significant holdings of dodo material, almost all found in the Mare aux Songes.

In October 2005, after a hundred years of neglect, a part of the Mare aux Songes swamp was excavated by an international team of researchers. To prevent Malaria, the British had covered the swamp in hard core during their rule over Mauritius, which had to be removed. Many remains were found, including bones of dodos in various stages of maturity, and several bones obviously from the skeleton of one individual dodo, which have been preserved in their natural position. These findings were made public in December 2005 in the Naturalis museum in Leiden. Of the fossils found in the swamp, 63% belonged to turtles of the extinct genus Cylindraspis, and 7.1% belonged to dodos, which had been deposited within several centuries, 4000 years ago. Subsequent excavations suggested that dodos, along with other animals, became mired in the Mare aux Songes while trying to reach water during a long period of severe drought about 4,200 years ago.

== Fossil content ==
The following lifeforms have been identified from fossils in the Mare aux Songes.

Color key: Taxon / Reclassified taxon / Taxon falsely reported as present / Dubious taxon or junior synonym / Ichnotaxon / Ootaxon / Morphotaxon

Notes
Uncertain or tentative taxa are in small text
~~crossed out~~ taxa are discredited.

=== Birds ===
Birds reported from the Mare aux Songes
| Genus | Species | Common name | Family | Locality | Material | IUCN status | Images |
|---|---|---|---|---|---|---|---|
| Alopochen | A. mauritianus | Mauritius sheldgoose | Anatidae | MAS19/20, MAS20/21 | | Extinct | Mauritius sheldgoose fossils |
| Anas | A. theodori | Mascarene teal | Anatidae | MAS19/20 | | Extinct | Mascarene teal fossils |
| Phoenicopterus | P. roseus | Greater flamingo | Phoenicopteridae | MAS19/20, MAS20/21 | Tarsometatarsus | Locally extinct | |
| Alectroenas | A. nitidissima | Mauritius blue pigeon | Columbidae | MAS19/20 | Tarsometatarsus | Extinct | Mauritius blue pigeon fossil |
| Nesoenas | N. mayeri | Pink pigeon | Columbidae | MAS19/20, MAS20/21 | Tarsometatarsus | Endangered | |
| Raphus | R. cucullatus | Dodo | Columbidae | MAS19/20, MAS20/21 | All skeletal elements known from the swamp | Extinct | Dodo fossils |
| Aphanapteryx | A. bonasia | Red rail | Rallidae | MAS19/20, MAS20/21 | Mandibles, tibiotarsi | Extinct | Red rail fossils |
| Fulica | F. newtoni | Mascarene coot | Rallidae | MAS19/20, MAS20/21 | Hip and leg bones | Extinct | Mascarene coot fossils |
| Gallinula | G. chloropus | Common moorhen | Rallidae | MAS19/20 | | Least concern | |
| Numenius | N. phaeopus | Eurasian whimbrel | Scolopacidae | MAS19/20 | | Least concern | |
| Egretta | E. dimorpha | Dimorphic egret | Ardeidae | MAS19/20 | | | |
| Nycticorax | N. mauritianus | Mauritius night heron | Ardeidae | MAS19/20, MAS20/21 | | Extinct | Mauritius night heron fossils |
| Papasula | P. abbottii nelsonii | Mascarene booby | Sulidae | MAS19/20 | | Extinct | |
| Phalacrocorax | P. africanus | Reed cormorant | Phalacrocoracidae | MAS19/20 | | Least concern | Reed cormorant fossils |
| Mascarenotus | M. sauzieri | Mauritius owl | Strigidae | MAS19/20, MAS20/21 | Humerus, tibia, tarsus, unguals | Extinct | Mauritius owl fossils |
| Circus | C. maillardi | Réunion harrier | Accipitridae | MAS19/20, MAS20/21 | Tarsometatarsi, tibiae and metacarpals | Locally extinct | Réunion harrier fossils |
| Falco | F. punctatus | Mauritius kestrel | Falconidae | MAS19/20 | | Endangered | |
| Lophopsittacus | L. mauritianus | Broad-billed parrot | Psittaculidae | MAS19/20, MAS20/21 | Skulls, mandibles, sternum, furcula, coracoids, humeri, ulnae, femora, tibiotarsi, carpometacarpus | Extinct | Broad-billed parrot fossils |
| Psittacula | P. eques | Echo parakeet | Psittaculidae | MAS19/20 | | Vulnerable | |
| Psittacula | P. bensoni | Thirioux's grey parakeet | Psittaculidae | MAS19/20, MAS20/21 | Palatines | Extinct | |
| Coracina | C. typica | Mauritius cuckoo-shrike | Campephagidae | MAS20/21 | Tibiotarsus | Vulnerable | |
| Foudia | F. rubra | Mauritius fody | Ploceidae | MAS20/21 | | Endangered | |
| Hypsipetes | H. olivaceus | Olive bulbul | Pycnonotidae | MAS20/21 | Tarsometatarsus | Vulnerable | |
| Zosterops | Z. sp. | Mascarene White-eye | Zosteropidae | MAS20/21 | | | |

=== Reptiles ===
Reptiles reported from the Mare aux Songes
| Genus | Species | Common name | Family | Locality | Material | IUCN status | Images |
|---|---|---|---|---|---|---|---|
| Cylindraspis | C. inepta | Saddle-backed Mauritius giant tortoise | Testudinidae | MAS19/20, MAS20/21 | Skulls, carapaces | Extinct | Skull of Cylindraspis sp. (8), Cylindraspis inepta (7), Cylindraspis triserrata (8) |
| Cylindraspis | C. triserrata | Domed Mauritius giant tortoise | Testudinidae | MAS19/20, MAS20/21 | Skulls, carapaces | Extinct | Skull of Cylindraspis sp. (8), Cylindraspis inepta (7), Cylindraspis triserrata (8) |
| Phelsuma | P. cf. guimbeaui | Orange-spotted day gecko | Geckoniidae | | Humerus | Endangered | |
| Leiolopisma | L. mauritiana | Mauritian giant skink | Scincidae | MAS19/20, MAS20/21 | Mandibles, vertebrae | Extinct | Mauritian giant skink fossils |
| Leiolopisma | L. telfairii | Round Island skink | Scincidae | MAS19/20, MAS20/21 | Humerus | Vulnerable | |
| Madatyphlops | M. cariei | Hoffstetter's worm snake | Typhlopidae | MAS19/20 | Seven trunk vertebrae | Extinct | |
| Casarea | C. dussumieri | Round Island boa | Typhlopidae | MAS19/20` | | Vulnerable | |

=== Mammals ===
Mammals reported from the Mare aux Songes
| Genus | Species | Common name | Family | Locality | Material | IUCN status | Images |
|---|---|---|---|---|---|---|---|
| Pteropus | Pteropus niger | Mauritian flying fox | Megachiroptera | MAS19/20, MAS20/21 | Mandible | Endangered | |
| Pteropus | Pteropus subniger | Small Mauritian flying fox | Megachiroptera | MAS19/20, MAS20/21 | Mandible | Extinct | Small Mauritian flying fox specimen |
| Mormopterus | M. acetabulosus | Natal free-tailed bat | Microchiroptera | MAS19/20, MAS20/21 | Phalanges | Vulnerable | Natal free-tailed bat type illustration |
| Taphozous | T. mauritianus | Mauritian tomb bat | Microchiroptera | MAS19/20, MAS20/21 | Phalanges | Least concern | |

=== Gastropods ===
Gastropods reported from the Mare aux Songes
| Genus | Species | Family | Material | IUCN status | Images |
|---|---|---|---|---|---|
| Cyclotopsis | C. conoidea | Pomatiidae | | Endangered | |
| Tropidophora | T. carinata | Pomatiidae | | Extinct | |
| Tropidophora | T. fimbriata | Pomatiidae | | Least concern | |
| Omphalotropis | O. variegata | Assimineidae | | Least concern | |
| Pachystyla | P. bicolor | Helicarionidae | | Vulnerable | |
| Melanoides | M. tuberculata | Thiaridae | | Least concern | |
| Vittina | V. gagates | Neritidae | | Least concern | |
| Bulinus | B. cernicus | Bulinidae | | Least concern | |
| Gyraulus | G. mauritianus | Planorbidae | | Least concern | |

=== Plants ===
Plants reported from the Mare aux Songes
| Genus / Taxon | Species | Family | IUCN status | Images |
|---|---|---|---|---|
| Dictyosperma | D. album | Arecaceae | Least concern | |
| Latania | L. loddigesii | Arecaceae | Endangered | |
| Latania | L. cf. lontaroides | Arecaceae | Extinct | |
| Canarium | C. paniculatum | Burseraceae | Endangered | |
| Cassine | C. orientalis | Celastraceae | Least concern | |
| Terminalia | T. bentzoe | Combretaceae | Vulnerable | |
| Cyathea | C. sp. | Cyatheaceae | | |
| Cyperaceae gen. indet. | Sp. indet. | Cyperaceae | | |
| Diospyros | D. sp. | Ebenaceae | | |
| Elaeocarpus | C. paniculatum | Elaeocarpaceae | Critically endangered | |
| Foetidia | F. mauritiana | Lecythidaceae | Vulnerable | |
| Eugenia | E. elliptica | Myrtaceae | | |
| Pandanus | P. cf. barklyi | Pandanaceae | Endangered | |
| Pandanus | P. iceryi | Pandanaceae | Critically endangered | |
| Pandanus | P. cf. macrostigma | Pandanaceae | Critically endangered | |
| Pandanus | P. vandermeeshii | Pandanaceae | Vulnerable | |
| Antirhea | A. borbonica | Rubiaceae | Least concern | |
| Stadmania | S. oppositifolia | Sapindaceae | Vulnerable | |
| Sideroxylon | S. boutonianum | Sapotaceae | Critically endangered | |
| Sideroxylon | S. grandiflorum | Sapotaceae | Endangered | |
