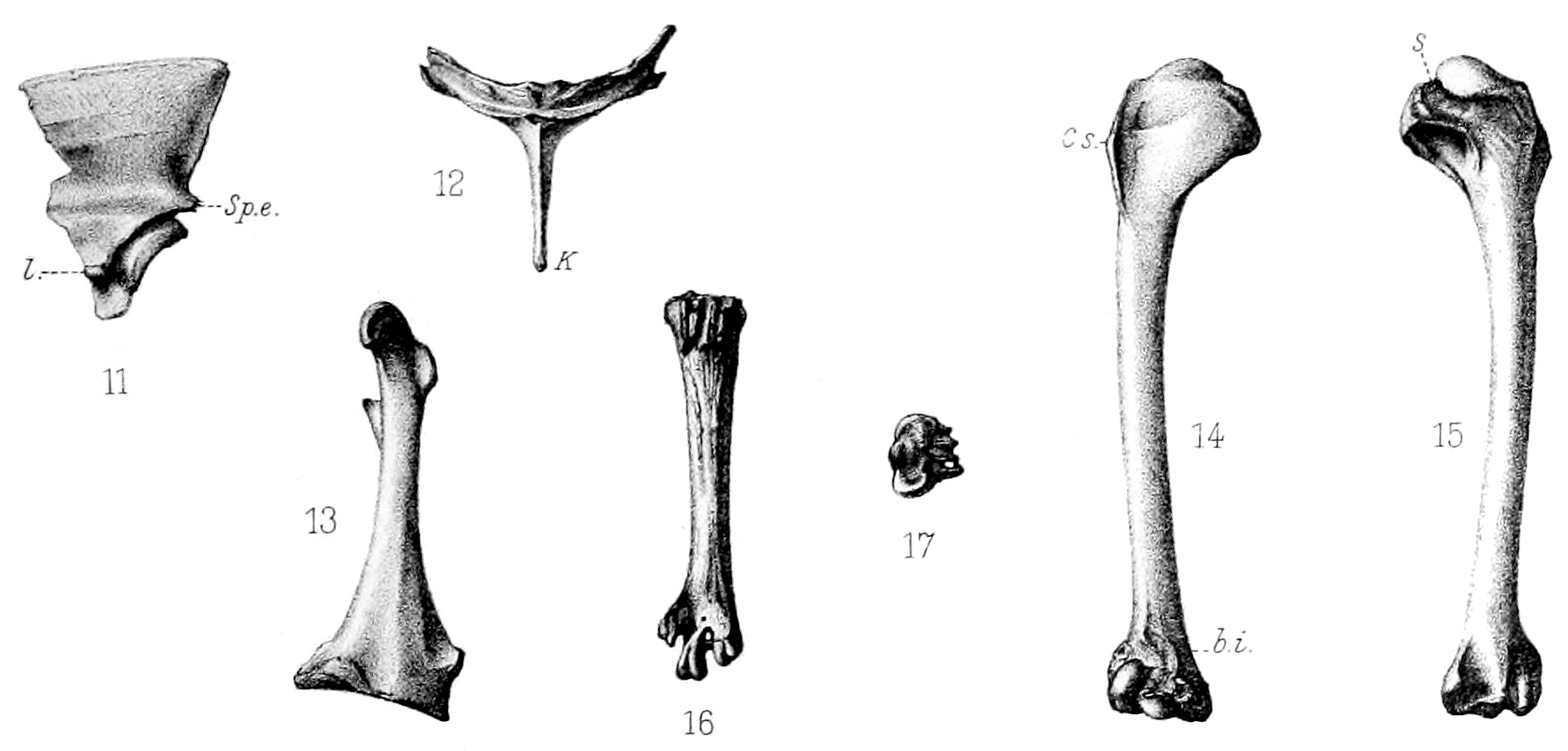
- Illustrations of the sternum (11-12), coracoid (13), humerus (14-15), and tarsometatarsus (16-17) from the 1893 description

Conservation status
- Extinct (around 1700 on Mauritius, 1710 on Réunion) (IUCN 3.1)

Scientific classification
- Kingdom: Animalia
- Phylum: Chordata
- Class: Aves
- Order: Anseriformes
- Family: Anatidae
- Genus: Anas
- Species: †A. theodori

Binomial name
- †Anas theodori Newton & Gadow, 1893
- Location of the Mascarene Islands in green, with Mauritius and Réunion where this species lived towards the West

= Mascarene teal =

Extinct species of bird

The Mascarene teal (Anas theodori), also known as the Mauritius duck and Sauzier's teal, is an extinct species of duck that lived on the Mascarene Islands of Mauritius and Réunion. A small duck was mentioned in 17th century accounts from these islands which is thought to be this species, and it may also be depicted in one illustration. In 1893, various bones from the Mare aux Songes swamp of Mauritius were used to name a new species in the duck genus Anas, A. theodori, after Théodore Sauzier who directed the excavations. Additional remains from Réunion were considered to belong to the same species in 1999, and it was determined to be related to the Sunda teal of the Indian Ocean.

The Mascarene teal was a small duck; in comparison with the extant ducks of Madagascar, it was larger than Bernier's teal, but smaller than Meller's duck. While overall most similar to the Sunda teal, the two differ in details of the sternum and lower leg bones. One contemporary account described the bird as "grey". Based on the proportions of its limb-bones, it had normal flight capabilities and was able to fly between Mauritius and Réunion, explaining how it occurred on both islands. It possibly nested in tree holes similar to related teals. The species was listed among the favourite prey of hunters; while abundant in 1681, it declined quickly thereafter, becoming extinct on Mauritius around 1700 and on Réunion a decade later. It was probably driven to extinction due to overhunting and predation by introduced animals, particularly cats.

== Taxonomy ==
A few inadequate accounts mentioned a small duck on the Mascarene Islands of Mauritius and Réunion in the 17th century. In 1889, the Mauritius government requested exploration of the Mare aux Songes swamp for "historical souvenirs", where vast amounts of dodo remains had earlier been found. The new excavations, under the direction of the French naturalist Théodore Sauzier, were successful, and apart from dodo bones, subfossil remains of other extinct animals, previously known as well as new species, were found. These bones were sent to the Cambridge Museum, where they were examined and described by the British ornithologist Edward Newton and the German ornithologist Hans Gadow in 1893. Based on the front part of a sternum (breast bone), a pair of coracoids (part of the shoulder), eight humeri (upper arm bones), and a pair of tarsometatarsi (lower leg bones) in bad condition, they determined the existence of a duck differing from those of Madagascar while being similar to Meller's duck (Anas melleri) of that island, but smaller. They named it as a new species in the duck genus Anas, A. theodori, in honour of Sauzier.

In 1987, the British ornithologist Graham S. Cowles reported a hitherto undescribed skull of a duck from the collection of Louis Étienne Thirioux, an amateur naturalist from Mauritius. As it differed from any other extant ducks from the island, it was suggested to be the first known skull of the species described by Newton and Gadow. In the same publication, the British ecologist Anthony S. Cheke suggested that a 1674 mention of ducks on Réunion by the French traveller Sieur Dubois could refer to this species, though the garganey (Spatula querquedula) also regularly visits the island in small numbers. He also pointed out that two reports mention sarcelles (teals) and canards (wild ducks) in addition to geese on Réunion, which may indicate there were two species of duck. The British ornithologist Hywel Glyn Young stated in 1996 that the exact relations of the species was uncertain, though it could be a southern teal (term for a small, wild duck) or a mallard.

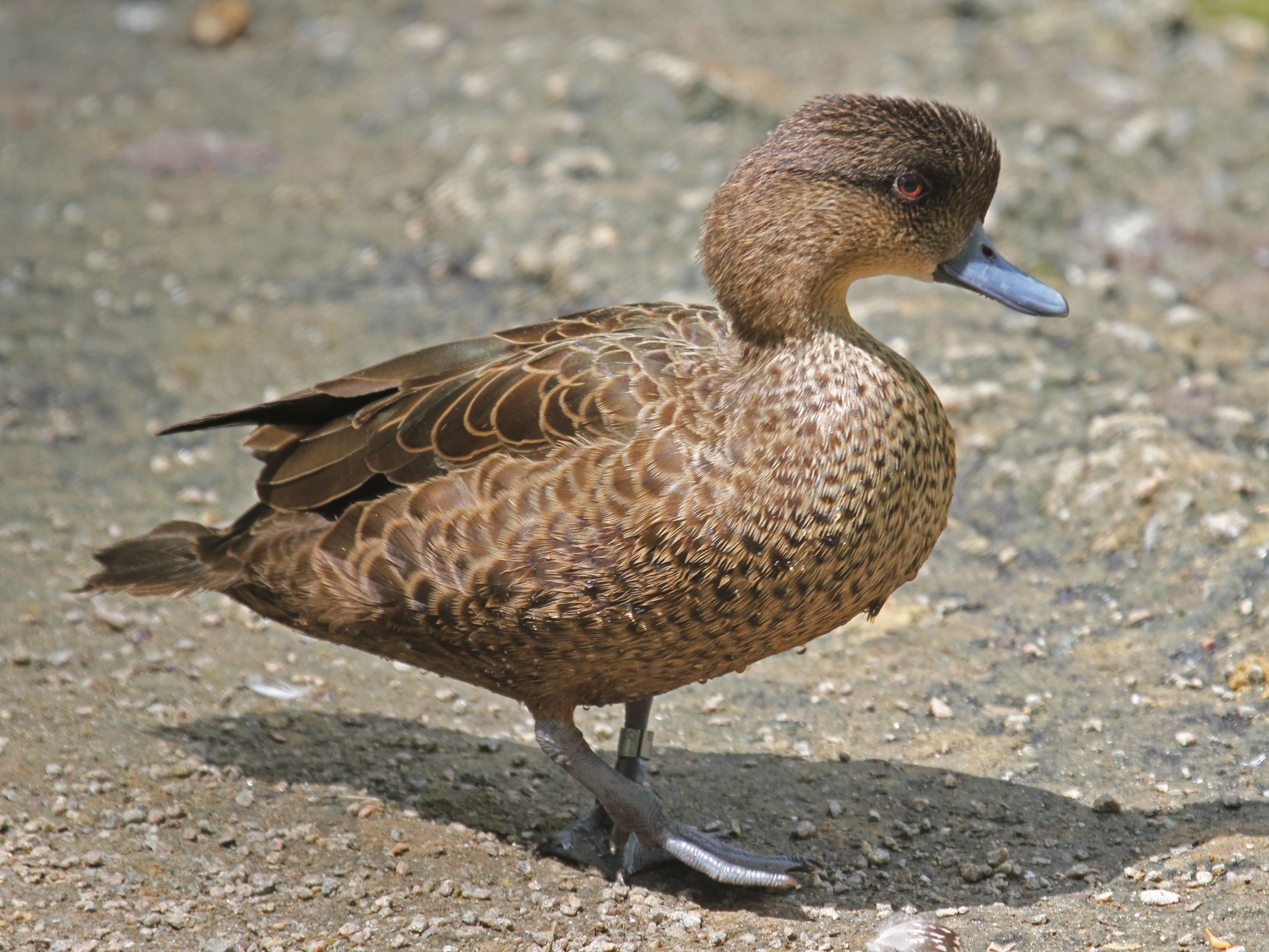
The related Sunda teal

In 1999, the French palaeontologist Cécile Mourer-Chauviré and colleagues reported the front part of a sternum, an ulna (a lower arm bone), and a tibiotarsus (a lower leg bone) from the Marais de l’Ermitage swamp on Réunion. By comparing these with bones of the Mascarene teal held in the National Museum of Natural History in France, which include a coracoid, four humeri, an incomplete juvenile carpometacarpus (part of the hand), a tibiotarsus, and two juvenile tarsometatarsi, they assigned the Réunion bones to the Mascarene teal, since the tibiotarsi were identical (the assigned sternum was too poorly preserved for comparison). By comparing the known bones of the Mascarene teal with those of other ducks, Mourer-Chauviré and colleagues found it to be most similar to the Sunda teal (Anas gibberifrons) from the East and North East of the Indian Ocean, while larger and smaller than the extant ducks of Madagascar, Bernier's teal (Anas bernieri) and Meller's duck, respectively.

Mourer-Chauviré and colleagues noted that Réunion lacks the kinds of distinctive flightless birds found on Mauritius such as the dodo, and that since Réunion is three million years old, this would be long enough for birds to lose their flight ability to the extent that it can be detected in their skeletons. They suggested that though members of the same birds groups initially colonised both Mauritius and Réunion, many of them evolving flightlessness, these species disappeared from Réunion due to volcanic eruptions of Piton des Neiges between 300,000 and 180,000 years ago. Thereafter the island would have been recolonised by flighted species like Mascarene teals from Mauritius, with none of them having time to become flightless since. They also reported two anatid (the family of ducks, geese, and swans) carpometacarpi from Réunion that differed from those of Anas, but were similar to those of Aythya.

In 2008, Cheke and the British palaeontologist Julian P. Hume noted that while the Mascarene teal was similar to both the Sunda teal and Bernier's teal, the latter is brown, while one description indicates the Mascarene species was grey like the Sunda species; these species belong to a group called "grey teals", indicating dispersal from the east. Several of these types were previously thought to be races of the Sunda teal, but are now considered full species. Cheke and Hume raised the possibility that the Sunda teal bones Mourer-Chauviré and colleagues compared with the Mascarene teal actually belonged to the Australian grey teal (A. gracilis). These writers suggested the ambiguous account of two kinds of ducks on Réunion could be explained by the possible Aythya remains, which they considered similar enough to the extant Madagascar pochard (Aythya innotata) that it could be that species.

== Description ==
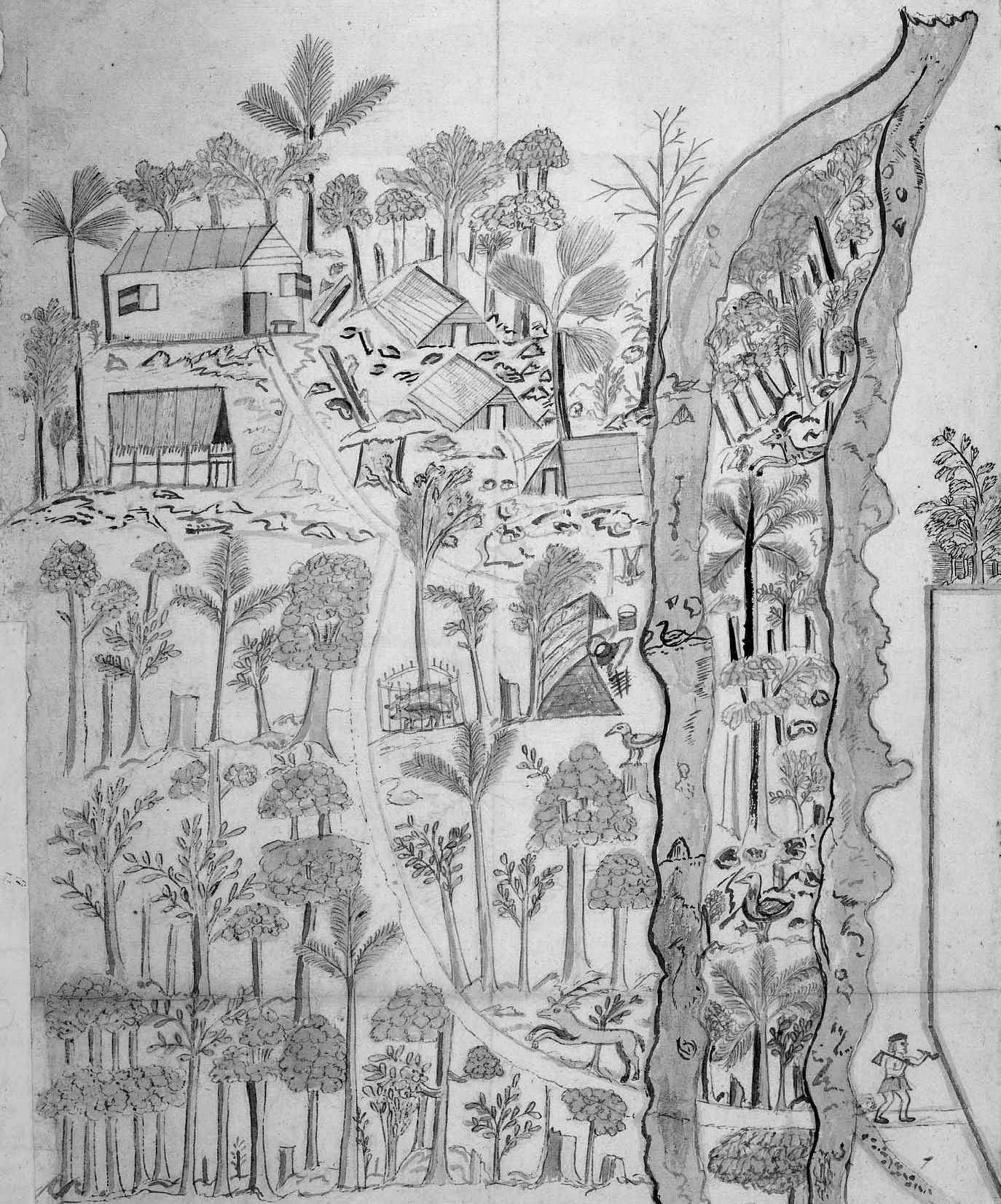
Illustration of a Dutch farm on Mauritius from 1670, which may show two Mascarene teals in the middle of the left stream, according to Anthony S. Cheke

The Mascarene teal was a small duck, and in comparison with the extant ducks of Madagascar, it was larger than Bernier's teal but smaller than Meller's duck. Based on the known bones, the sternum was 27.7 mm (1 in) wide and 21.7 mm (1 in) deep, the coracoid 41.1–42.5 mm (2–2 in) long, the humerus 69.6–73.1 mm (3–3 in) long, the ulna 63 mm (2 in) long, the tibiotarsus 71 mm (3 in) long, and the tarsometatarsus 42 mm (2 in) long.

While overall most similar to the Sunda teal, the Mascarene teal differs in that the carina of the sternum (a keel-like ridge) projects further forwards, and the lower manubrial spine (a projection from the sternum) is narrow and elongated in the Sunda teal, and more elongated than in the Mascarene teal. The coracoid of the Mascarene teal is very similar to that of the Sunda teal. They both share a small, upwards directed spike on the internal side of the coracoid's hind surface, followed by a small depression. On the coracoid's front surface, near the acrocoracoid's (an upwards expansion of the coracoid) internal side, there is an almost circular muscle scar (for the attachment of muscles) in both species.

The humeri of the Mascarene and Sunda teal look very similar, with the humeral head (the upper, expanded part of the bone) forming a well-developed rim over the tricipital fossa (a depression), with a well-developed and elongated pectoral attachment. The ulna of the Mascarene teal is, like that of the Sunda teal, short and stout, and is the same size as in the male of the extant species. The humero-ulnar depression is pronounced at the ulna's upper end. As in the Sunda teal, the external condyle (round prominence) on the lower end of the ulna extends by a narrow, well-defined lip (a raised edge), which rises up along the shaft. Compared to those of the Sunda teal, the tibiotarsus and tarsometatarsus are longer and more robust in the Mascarene teal, and their upper and lower parts are wider, but the proportions of these and the coracoid are very close overall between the species.

=== Contemporary records ===
The 1681 ship's log of the British President mentioned gray teals on Mauritius, the only account that described its appearance:

Up a little within the woods are several ponds and lakes of water with great numbers of flamingoes and gray teal and geese; but for the geese these are most in the woods or dry ponds. No ducks on the island.

Cheke and Hume suggested in 2008 that "no ducks" was in reference to large, meaty ducks, unlike the small teal. The only contemporary mention of small anatids from Réunion is Dubois's from 1674:

River ducks, smaller than European ones, feathered like teals. They are good [to eat]

In 2001, Cheke attempted to identify bird species on a 1670 illustration of a Dutch farm at Foul Bay, Mauritius, which showed agricultural practices and various animals. Cheke was primarily concerned with identifying a bird that had previously been suggested to be a dodo, which he instead considered a Mauritius sheldgoose. He found the other birds more enigmatic; he identified a crow-like bird as the extant Mauritius bulbul, and suggested two other waterbirds depicted in a stream could be cormorants or ducks. He noted that no visitors had mentioned living cormorants, while the Mascarene teal was still abundant at the time.

== Behaviour and ecology ==
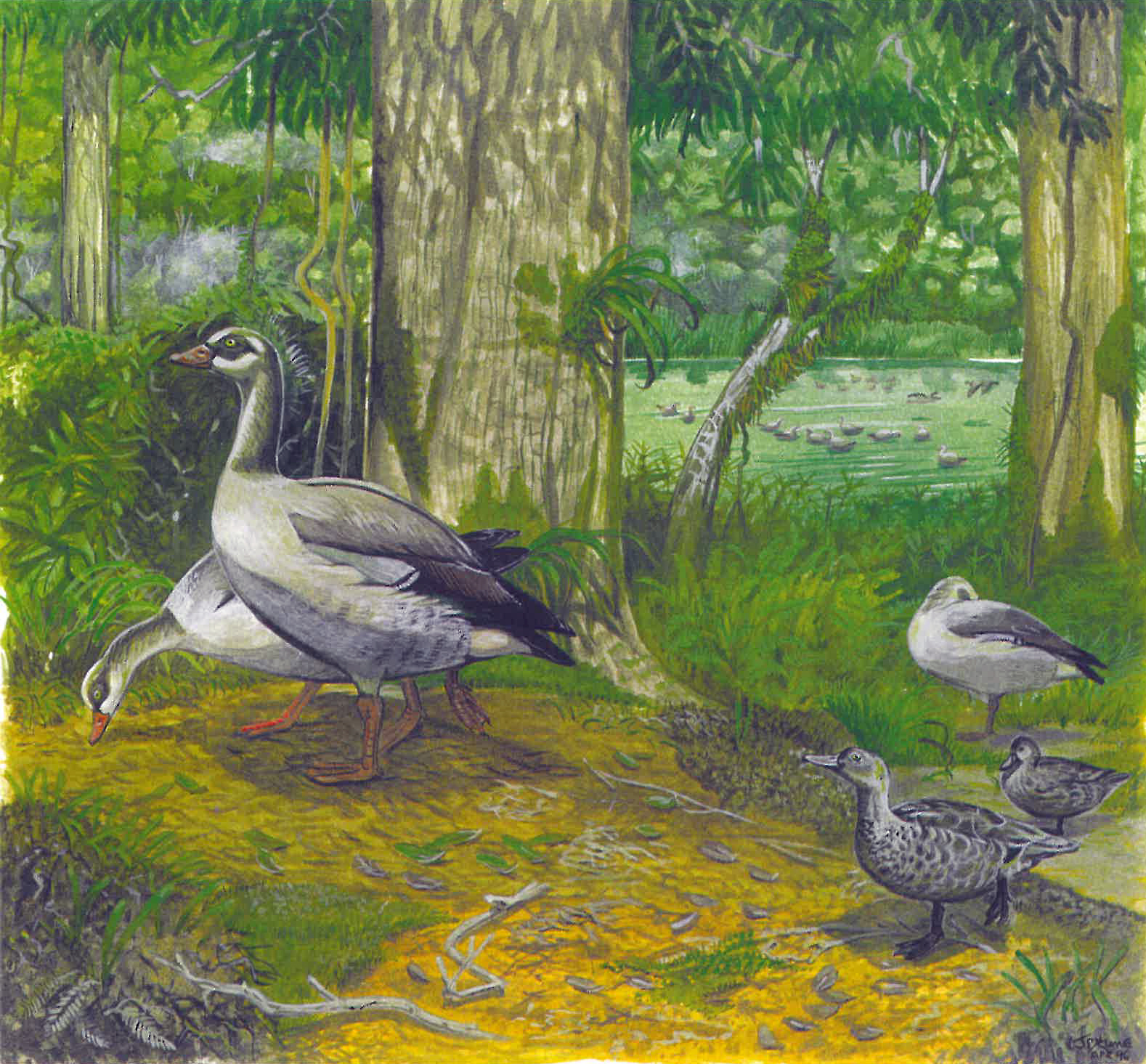
Life restoration of two Mascarene teals (lower right) and Réunion sheldgeese (left) by Julian P. Hume, 1996

Mourer-Chauviré and colleagues stated in 1999 that the proportions of the Mascarene teal's limb-bones are very similar to those of the Sunda teal, indicating no reduction in flight capability, and are very different from those of flightless species like the Auckland teal (Anas aucklandica) and the Amsterdam wigeon (Anas marecula). It is possible that the Mascarene teal had normal flight capabilities and was able to fly between Mauritius and Réunion, explaining how it occurred on both islands. Hume and the British ornithologist Michael Walters added in 2012 that it may also have moved seasonally. Cheke and Hume suggested in 2008 that, like the related Bernier's and Indo-Australasian teals, the Mascarene teal possibly nested in tree holes, as did the local starlings and parrots.

Many other endemic species of Mauritius and Réunion were lost after the arrival of humans, so that the ecosystems of these islands are severely damaged and hard to conserve. Before humans arrived, the islands were entirely covered in forests, very little of which remains today because of deforestation. The surviving endemic fauna is still seriously threatened. On Mauritius, the Mascarene teal lived alongside other recently extinct birds such as the dodo, the Mauritian sheldgoose, the red rail, the broad-billed parrot, the Mauritius blue pigeon, the Mauritius scops owl, and the Mauritius night heron. On Réunion, it lived alongside the Réunion sheldgoose, the Réunion ibis, the hoopoe starling, the Mascarene parrot, the Réunion swamphen, the Réunion scops owl, the Réunion night heron, and the Réunion pink pigeon. The Mascarene coot and the Mascarene grey parakeet also lived on both islands. Surviving endemic birds include the echo parakeet, the Mauritius kestrel, and the pink pigeon on Mauritius, and the Réunion harrier, the Réunion bulbul, and the Réunion stonechat on Réunion.

== Extinction ==
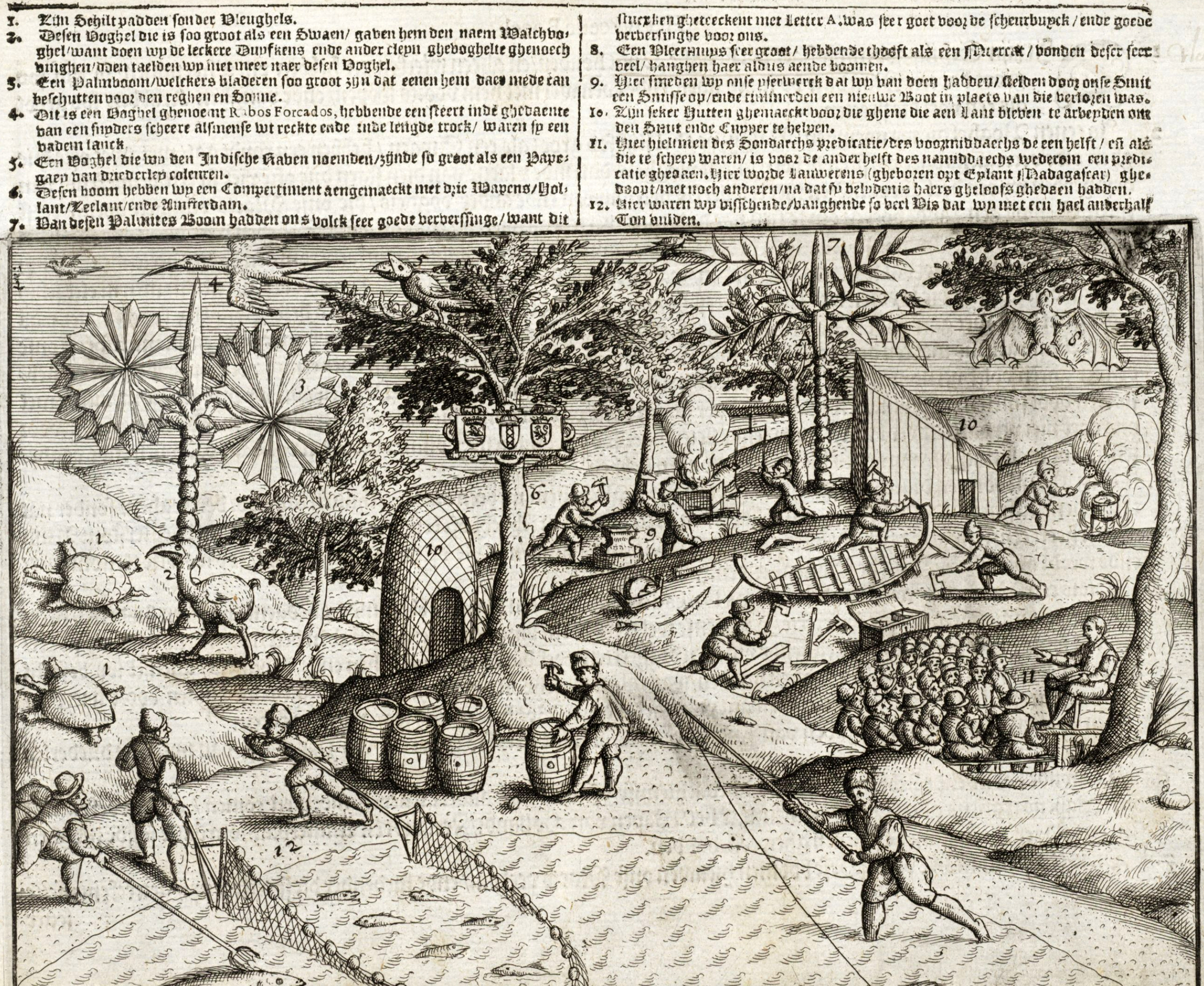
1601 engraving showing Dutch activities on the shore of Mauritius

Travellers to Mauritius and Réunion considered the local birds tame and easy to kill; ducks and geese were listed among the favourite prey of hunters there. Cheke stated in 1987 that the Mascarene teals were considered abundant on Mauritius in 1681 but quickly declined thereafter; the French explorer François Leguat considered them rare in 1693, and the Dutch governor of Mauritius Roelof Deodati was the last to mention them in 1696. Cheke added that since the number of men on these islands was low in the 1600s, it is unlikely they would have been responsible for the extinction of widespread animals, but those limited to certain habitats, like ducks and geese, may have been exterminated by hunting, though reduced breeding would probably be due to introduced animals. One 1709 account stated wildfowl could still be found on Réunion, but Cheke suspected it to be hearsay, as they were not mentioned by a 1705 account, and one from 1710 declared them extinct.

Cheke and Hume suggested in 2008 that the introduction of cats to Mauritius possibly in the 1680s led to a rapid decline in ground-nesting birds, and while the Mascarene teals may have nested in tree holes, the ducklings would still have to walk from their trees to water. They pointed out that the last mention of "wild ducks" was from 1696 and "ducks" in 1706, but both probably referred to farmyard ducks. The International Union for Conservation of Nature has accepted the 1696 date. Hume and Walters stated in 2012 that the teals were not mentioned on Mauritius after 1700 and on Réunion a decade later, and listed overhunting to be the primary cause of extinction. Cheke elaborated in 2013 that the main culprit was cats, with hunting being secondary, and the species survived introduced rats and pigs.
