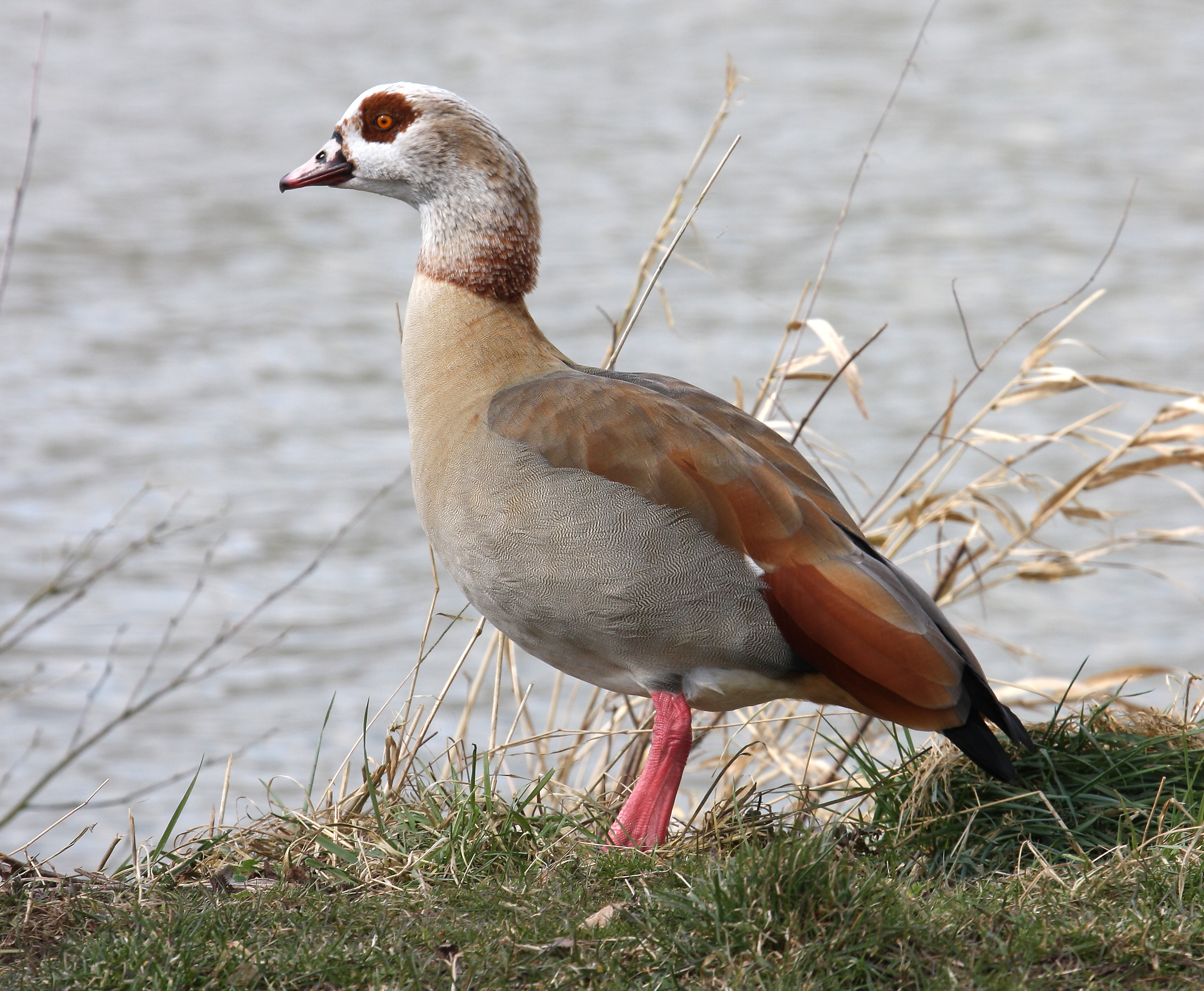
- Egyptian goose

Scientific classification
- Kingdom: Animalia
- Phylum: Chordata
- Class: Aves
- Order: Anseriformes
- Family: Anatidae
- Subfamily: Anatinae
- Genus: Alopochen; Stejneger, 1885

Synonyms
- Chenalopex Stephens 1824 non Vieillot 1818; Mascarenochen Cowles 1994; Proanser Umans'ka 1979a; Anserobranta Kuročkin & Ganya 1972

= Alopochen =

Genus of birds

Alopochen is a genus of the bird family Anatidae, part of the subfamily Tadorninae along with the shelducks. It contains one extant species, the Egyptian goose (Alopochen aegyptiaca), and three which became extinct in the last 1,000 years or so. The Egyptian goose is native to mainland Africa, and the recently extinct species are from Madagascar and the Mascarene Islands.

mtDNA cytochrome b sequence data suggest that the relationships of Alopochen to Tadorna need further investigation.

== Species ==
- Egyptian goose (Alopochen aegyptiaca)

The extinct species of the genus are:

- †Malagasy shelduck or Madagascar shelduck (Alopochen sirabensis) (Andrews 1897) (may be a subspecies of A. mauritiana) – Madagascar, Late Pleistocene: see Late Quaternary prehistoric birds
- †Mauritius sheldgoose (Alopochen mauritiana) (Newton & Gadow 1893) – Mauritius, late 1690s
- †Réunion sheldgoose or Kervazo's Egyptian goose (Alopochen kervazoi) (Cowles 1994) Mourer-Chauviré et al. 1999 – Réunion, circa 1690s
- †Alopochen tarabukini (Kuročkin & Ganea) – Moldova and Ukraine, Late Miocene

The generic name looks like Greek ἀλώπηξ + χήν = "fox-goose", referring to the colour of its back, but with a Greek language error; the linguistically correct form would have been *Alopecchen or *Alopecochen.
