= Graham S. Cowles =

British ornithologist and paleornithologist (1931–2024)

Graham Stewart Cowles (27 June 1931 – 19 January 2024) was a British ornithologist and paleornithologist.

== Life and career ==
In January 1949, Cowles joined the bird department of the Natural History Museum in London as an assistant. He then served in the British Armed Forces for 2 years from January 1950. From 1952, as a curatorial Assistant, he was assigned to the avian osteology collection of the British Museum (Natural History).

In 1961, he accompanied Peter Colston on an expedition to Andalusia and from 1962 to 1963 and 1965, he joined expeditions to Australia, financed by Australian zoologist and philanthropist Harold Wesley Hall (1888–1964). From 1971, he transferred the bird collections to the Natural History Museum at Tring where they were curated and supervised by Colston and Cowles. In January 1977 he was appointed Senior Scientific Officer and after I.C.J. Galbraith retired in 1985, Cowles became head curator of the bird collection until his own retirement at the end of June 1991.

Cowles described the Hall's babbler (Pomatostomus halli) in 1964 and the subspecies of the Collared Kingfisher (Halcyon chloris) in 1980. In 1994, Cowles described the Réunion sheldgoose (Alopochen kervazoi) and the Réunion kestrel (Falco duboisi) after extensive research on subfossil bird species of the Mascarene Islands in 1987 and in chapter "2-The Fossil Record" in the work Studies of Mascarene Island Birds.

In 1974, Cowles participated in an expedition of the British Ornithologists' Union to Réunion island. During study of the Vergoz caverns near La-Saline-les-Bains and a coastal cave near Saint-Paul, he collected fragments of the extinct turtle species Saddle-backed Mauritius giant tortoise (Cylindraspis inepta).

Cowles published the book Birds (Instructions for Collectors) in 1970 in collaboration with Colin James Oliver Harrison (1926–2003). In 1974, Cowles wrote the chapter "Timaliidae – Quail-thrushes & Babblers" in Pat Hall's book Birds of the Harold Hall Australian Expeditions 1962–1970.

Cowles died on 19 January 2024, at the age of 92.

== Dedication names ==
Julian P. Hume named the Rodrigues bulbul (Hypsipetes cowlesi) in honour of Graham S. Cowles in 2015.
