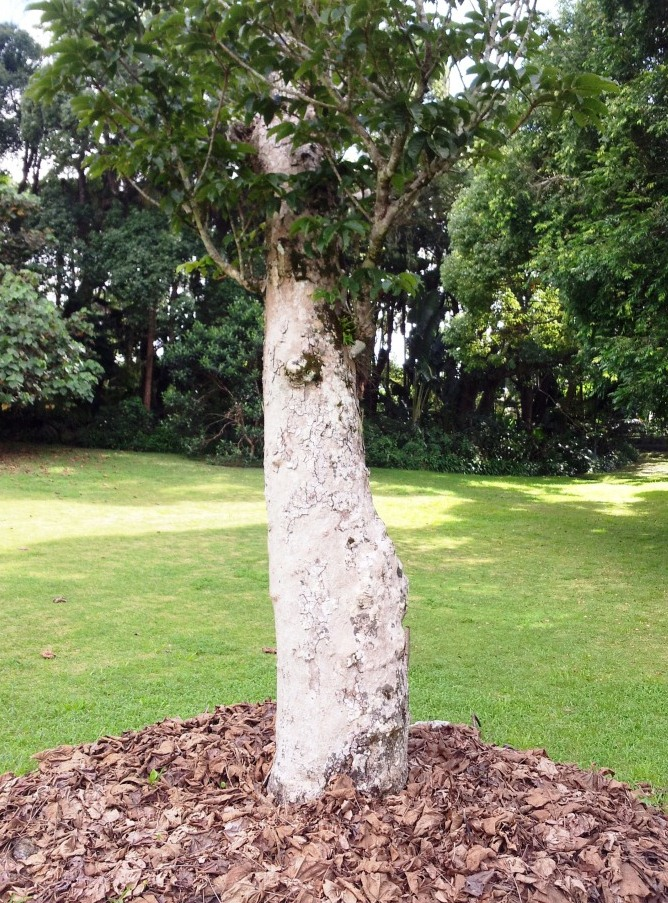

Conservation status
- Endangered (IUCN 2.3)

Scientific classification
- Kingdom: Plantae
- Clade: Tracheophytes
- Clade: Angiosperms
- Clade: Eudicots
- Clade: Rosids
- Order: Sapindales
- Family: Burseraceae
- Genus: Canarium
- Species: C. paniculatum

Binomial name
- Canarium paniculatum (Lam.) Benth. ex Engl.

Synonyms
- Bursera paniculata Lam.; Canarium colophania Baker; Canarium mauritanum Oken; Colophonia mauritiana DC.; Fagara elaphrium Willd.

= Canarium paniculatum =

Species of flowering plant

Canarium paniculatum is a species of flowering plant in the family Burseraceae. It is a tree endemic to Mauritius.

The species was first described as Bursera paniculata by Jean-Baptiste Lamarck in 1788. In 1883 Adolf Engler placed the species in genus Canarium as C. paniculatum.
