= Julian P. Hume =

English paleontologist and artist

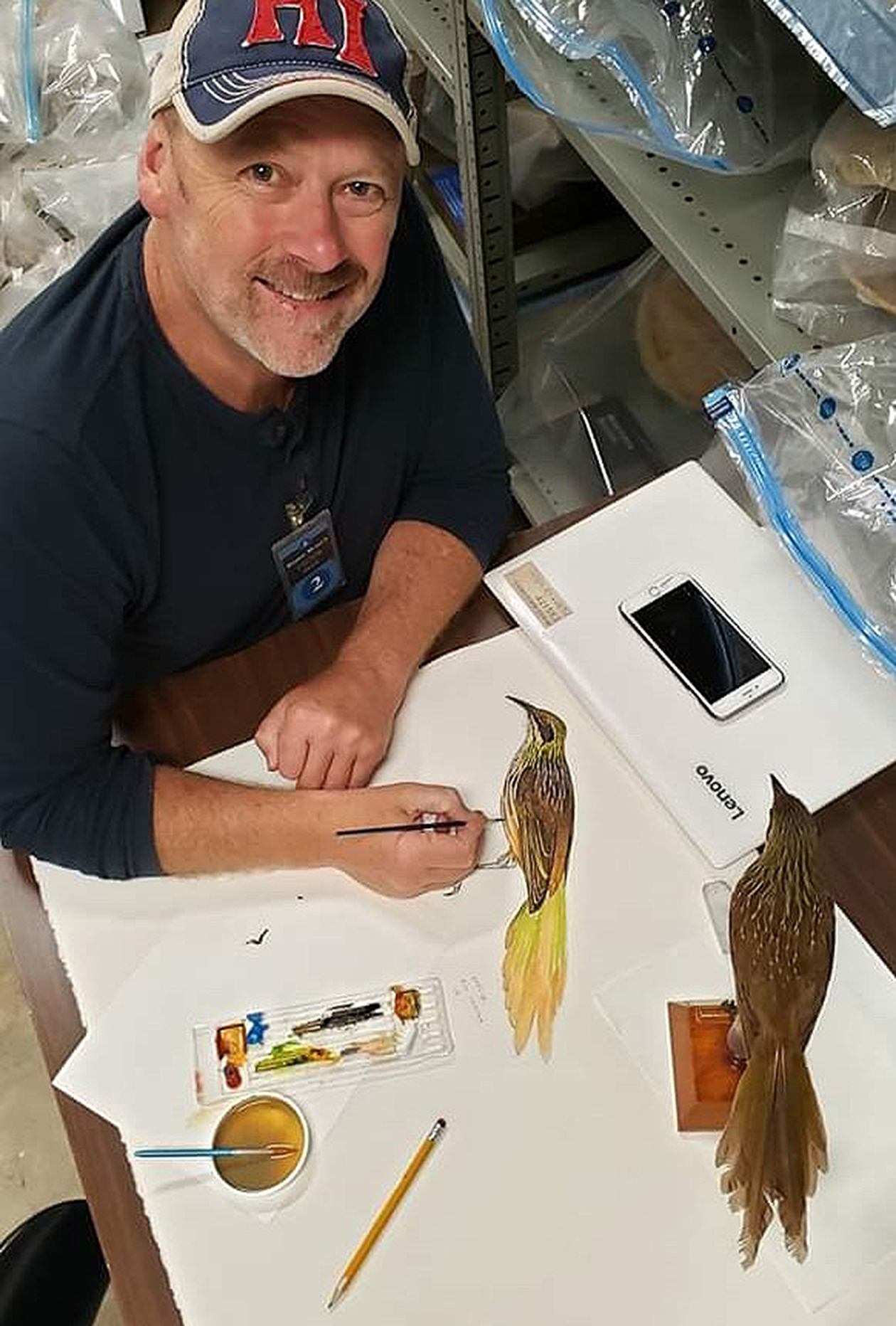
J P Hume illustrating a skin of the extinct Hawaii Kioea (Chaetoptila angustipluma)

Julian Pender Hume (born 3 March 1960) is an English palaeontologist, artist and writer who lives in Wickham, Hampshire. He was born in Ashford, Kent, and grew up in Portsmouth, England.

== Scientific career ==
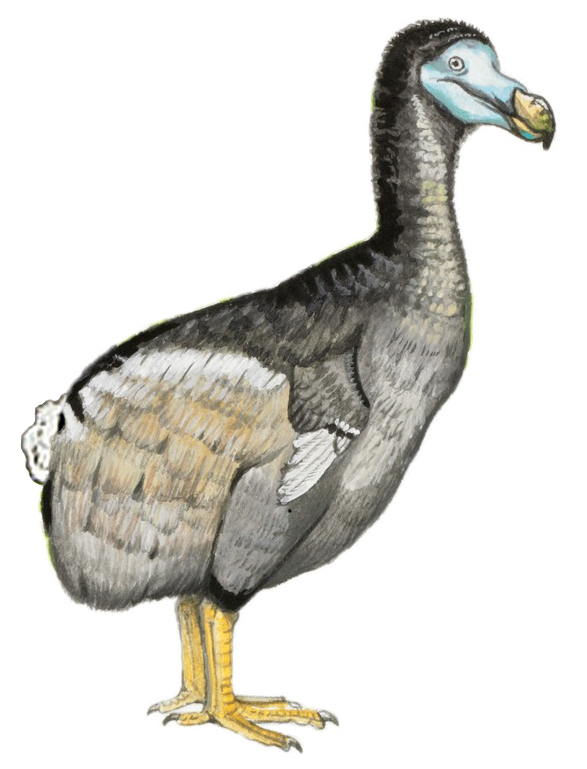
Life restoration of the dodo by Hume, an extinct bird he has published extensively about

He attended Crookhorn Comprehensive School between 1971 and 1976. His career began as an artist, specialising in the reconstruction of extinct species, after which he undertook a degree in palaeontology at the University of Portsmouth, followed by a PhD in the same subject, jointly hosted by the University of Portsmouth and the Natural History Museum, London and Tring. He is presently a research associate at the Natural History Museum, and has travelled extensively, working on fossil excavations that include the Cape Verde Islands; Lord Howe Island, Tasmania, Flinders, King and Kangaroo Islands, Australia; Madagascar, Seychelles, and Hawaiian Islands. However, his main area of research is the Mascarene Islands of Mauritius, Réunion, and Rodrigues, where in particular he has studied the history of the dodo (Raphus cucullatus).

He has contributed both scientifically and artistically to a large number of palaeontological papers, and described ten new species of extinct bird from the islands, with at least five more awaiting description. He has also written popular books and magazine articles, and published a critically acclaimed book 'Lost Land of the Dodo,' co-authored with Anthony S. Cheke, on the subject of extinct Mascarene species. His other books include 'Extinct Birds of Hawaii' published in 2016 with Michael Walther, which includes his own artwork for all fossil species. His latest book, which also includes his own artwork, is the second edition of the book entitled 'Extinct Birds', published in September 2017; the first edition was co-authored with Michael P. Walters (ornithologist) and published February 2012. A third edition is currently in preparation.

== Artwork ==
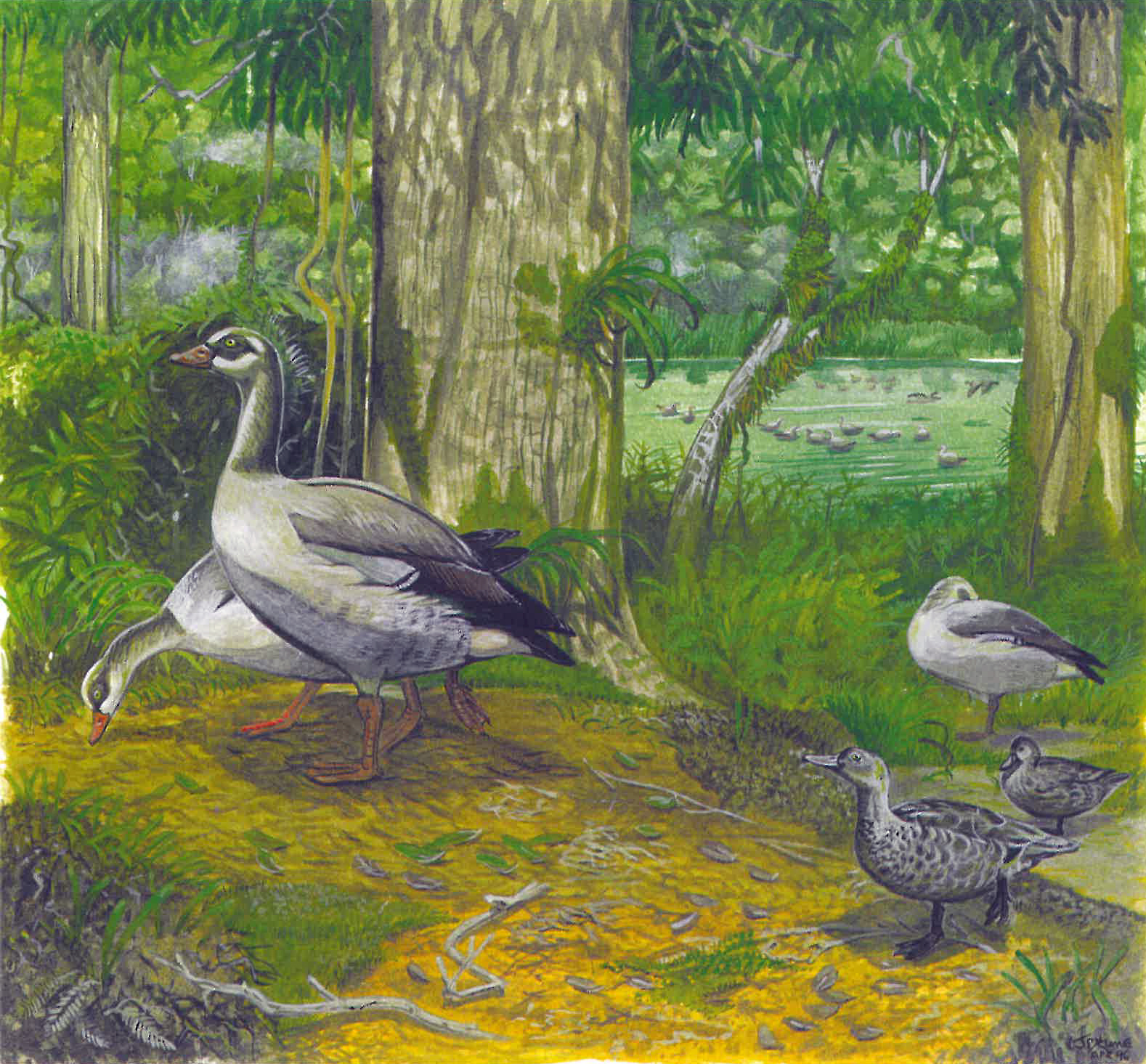
Restorations of Réunion shelducks (left, large) and Mascarene ducks (right, smaller) by Hume

His paintings of recently extinct species, especially birds, are a combination of art and science, with each painting reproduced in the most scientifically accurate way. His subjects include extinct species from islands around the world, especially the Hawaiian Islands and the Mascarenes. The dodo in particular has been illustrated on a number of occasions.

== Bibliography ==
- Carpenter J, Wilmshurst J, Hume J P, McConkey K, Shiels A, Wotton D & Drake D (2020) The forgotten fauna: native seed predators on islands. Functional Ecology 00:1–12. https://doi.org/10.1111/1365-2435.13629
- Duhamel, A, Hume J P, Salaviale C & Louchart A (2020) Unexpected cranial evolution in the extinct Rodrigues Island owl Otus murivorus (Strigidae), associated with gigantism, ecology, diet and behaviour. Scientific Reports 10:14019 | https://doi.org/10.1038/s41598-020-69868-1
- Burney D A, Hume J P, Randalana R, Andrianaivoarivelo R, Griffiths O, Middleton G, Rasolondrainy T, Hoerman R, Ramilisonina R & Radimilahy C (2020) Rock art from Andriamamelo Cave in the Beanka Protected Area of western Madagascar. Journal of Island & Coastal Archaeology https://doi.org/10.1080/15564894.2020.1749735
- Burney D A, Andriamialison H, Andrianarivelo R, Bourne S, Crowley B E, de Boer E, Godfrey L R, Goodman S M, Griffiths C, Griffiths O, Hume J P. et al. (7 more authors) (2019) Subfossil lemur discoveries from the Beanka protected area in western Madagascar. Quaternary Research 1–17. https://doi.org/10.1017/qua.2019.54
- Hume J P (2019) Systematics, morphology, and ecology of rails (Aves: Rallidae) of the Mascarene Islands, with one new species. Zootaxa 4626(1): 001–107.
- Hume J P & Martill D (2019) Repeated evolution of flightlessness in Dryolimnas rails (Aves: Rallidae) after extinction and recolonization on Aldabra. Zoological Journal of the Linnean Society 186(3): 666–672. https://doi.org/10.1093/zoolinnean/zlz018
- Jones C, Jackson H, McGowan R, Hume J P, Forshaw J, Tatayah V & Groombridge J (2018) A parakeet specimen held at National Museums, Scotland, is a unique skin of the extinct Réunion Parakeet Psittacula eques eques. A reply to Cheke & Jansen (2016). Ibis 161: 230–238.
- Louchart A, Bastian F, Baptista M, Guarino-Vignon P, Hume J P, Jacot-des-Combes C, Mourer-Chauviré C, Hänni C & Ollivier M (2018) Ancient DNA reveals the origins, colonisation histories and evolutionary pathways of two recently extinct species of large
- Hume J P (2017) Extinct Birds. Second Edition. Bloomsbury Natural History. 608 pp.
- Walther M (2016) Extinct Birds of Hawaii. Mutual Publishing, LLC. ISBN 1939487617. 256 pp (illustrations by J. P. Hume)
- Hume J P (2012) The Dodo: from extinction to the fossil record. Geology Today 28(4): 147–151.
- Hume J P & Walters M (2012) Extinct Birds. A & C Black (Poyser Imprint). 544 pp.
- Hume J P (2011) Systematics, morphology, and ecology of pigeons and doves (Aves: Columbidae) of the Mascarene Islands, with three new species. Zootaxa 3124: 1–62.
- Rijsdijk, K F, Zinke J, de Louw P G B, Hume J P (11 more authors) (2011) Mid-Holocene (4200 kyr BP) mass mortalities in Mauritius (Mascarenes): Insular vertebrates resilient to climatic extremes but vulnerable to human impact. The Holocene doi:10.1177/0959683611405236
- Hume J P, & Middleton G (2011) A preliminary vertebrate palaeontological cave survey of the Comoros Islands. Phelsuma 19: 26–40.
- Burney D A (2010) Back to the Future in the Caves of Kaua'i: A Scientist's Adventures in the Dark. Yale University Press. ISBN 0300150946 (illustrations by J. P. Hume).
- Hume J P, Cheke A S, & McOran-Campbell A (2009) How Owen 'stole' the Dodo: academic rivalry and disputed rights to a newly discovered subfossil deposit in nineteenth century Mauritius. Historical Biology 21 (1–2): 1–18.
- Rijsdijk K F, Hume, J P. et al. (18 more authors) (2009) Mid-Holocene vertebrate bone Concentration-Lagerstätte on oceanic island Mauritius provides a window into the ecosystem of the Dodo (Raphus cucullatus). Quaternary Science Reviews 28: 14–24.
- Cheke A & Hume J P (2008) Lost land of the Dodo: the ecological history of the Mascarene Islands. A. & C. Black publishers (Poyser imprint). 540pp. ISBN 978-0-7136-6544-4
- Hume J P (2007) Reappraisal of the parrots (Aves: Psittacidae) from the Mascarene islands, with comments on their ecology, morphology and affinities. Zootaxa 1513: 1–76.
- Hume J P (2006) The history of the dodo Raphus cucullatus and the penguin of Mauritius. Historical Biology 18(2): 65–89.
- Hume J P, Datta A & Martill, D.M. (2006) Unpublished drawings of the Dodo Raphus cucullatus and a note on Dodo skin relics. Bulletin of the British Ornithologists' Club 126A: 49–54.
- Hume J P (2005) Contrasting taphofacies in ocean island settings: the fossil record of Mascarene vertebrates. Monografies de la Societat d’Història Natural de les Balears 12: 129–144.
- Hume J P & Prys-Jones R P (2005) New discoveries from old sources, with reference to the original bird and mammal fauna of the Mascarene Islands, Indian Ocean. Zoologische Mededelingen Leiden 79-3: 85–95.
- Karanth K P, Palkovacs E, Gerlach J, Glaberman S, Hume J P, Caccone A & Yoder A D (2005) Native Seychelles tortoises or Aldabran imports? The importance of radiocarbon dating for ancient DNA studies. Amphibia-Reptilia 26: 116–121.
- Hume J P (2004) A preliminary vertebrate palaeontological survey of the granitic Seychelles islands. Phelsuma 12: 24–34.
- Hume J P & Cheke A S (2004) The White Dodo of Réunion Island: unravelling a scientific and historical myth. Archives of Natural History 31: 57–79.
- Hume J P, Martill D M & Dewdney C (2004) Dutch diaries and the demise of the Dodo. Nature doi:10.1038/nature02688
- Hume J P (2003) The journal of the flagship Gelderland – dodo and other birds on Mauritius 1601. Archives of Natural History 30: 13–27.
- Hume J P & Peterson A (2003) The correct publication date of Aplonis corvina (Kittlitz, 1833). Bulletin of the British Ornithologists' Club 123: 207–208.
- Hume J P (2002) Notes on the extinct Kosrae Starling Aplonis corvina Kittlitz, 1833. Bulletin of the British Ornithologists' Club 122: 141–154.
- Hume J P (1996) The parrots of the Mascarenes. PsittaScene 8(1): 10–11.

== Magazine articles ==
- Hume J P (2009) The great Dodo dispute. BBC History 10 (3): 50–53.
- Hume J P (2009) In search of the Dodo. Darwin 200 BBC Knowledge 4: 26–31.

== Postage stamp issues ==
- Hume J P (25 June 2007) Mauritius. The Dodo Raphus cucullatus. Set of four Rs 5; Rs 10; Rs 15; Rs 25; all showing classic images of the dodo from the last 400 years. Souvenir Sheet Rs 25 of Dodo in dry forest by J P Hume.
- Hume J P (16 July 2009) Mauritius. Extinct Mauritian Giant Tortoises. Set of four Rs 5; Rs 10; Rs 15; Rs 25; all showing extinct giant tortoises of Mauritius and Rodrigues. Souvenir Sheet Rs 50 showing Rodrigues giant tortoises and the extinct blue rail.

== Filmography ==
Date	Title	Role	Notes
2 October 2001	Extinct; UK Channel 4	Presenter/consultant	Episode 1 (of 6): "The Dodo"
4 November 2001	The Dodo's Guide to Surviving Extinction; UK BBC Four	Himself (as Dr Julian Hume)	A TV programme shown as part of a night of programming dedicated to extinction.
18 March 2010	Museum of Life; UK BBC One	Himself (as Dr Julian Hume)	A TV programme about scientific activities in the Natural History Museum, London.
	All Creatures Great and Small	Himself	
	A Museum in a Modern World	Himself	
September 2011	Museum Secrets; History (UK TV channel)	Himself (as Dr Julian Hume)	Episode 5 (of 6): "The Dodo"
