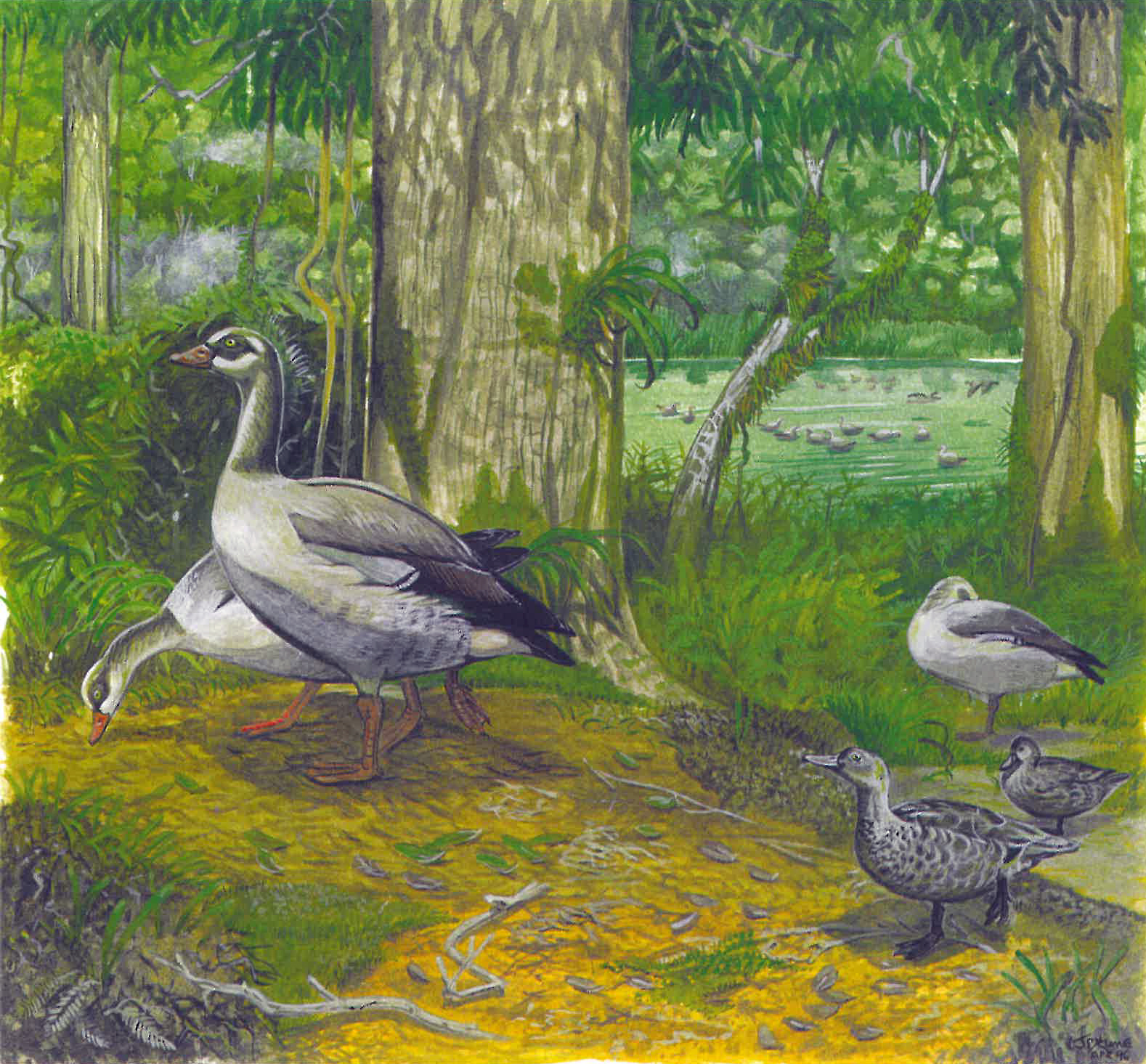
- Restorations of Réunion sheldgeese (left, large) and Mascarene teals (right, smaller) by Julian P. Hume

Conservation status
- Extinct (c.1690) (IUCN 3.1)

Scientific classification
- Kingdom: Animalia
- Phylum: Chordata
- Class: Aves
- Order: Anseriformes
- Family: Anatidae
- Genus: Alopochen
- Species: †A. kervazoi

Binomial name
- †Alopochen kervazoi (Cowles, 1994)
- Location of Réunion

Synonyms
- Mascarenachen kervazoi Cowles, 1994

= Réunion sheldgoose =

Extinct species of bird

The Réunion sheldgoose or Kervazo's Egyptian goose (Alopochen kervazoi) is an extinct species of sheldgoose from Réunion. It was a close relative of the Egyptian goose and was about the same size. There is only one description remaining, that of Dubois made in 1674. Apart from that, the species is only known from brief reports and subfossil bones, collected by British ornithologist Graham S. Cowles. Dubois' full account reads as follows:

Wild geese, slightly smaller than the European geese. They have the same feathering, but with the bill and feet red. They are very good [to eat].

== Extinction ==
Waterfowl on Réunion were overhunted. As early as 1667, François Martin complained of unsustainable hunting. The last record of the species is a 1709 listing of de la Merveille who stated that ducks and geese occurred "in quantity", but as Jean Feuilley had not listed waterfowl in his 1705 catalogue of Réunion's animals, de la Merveille's record is obviously based on obsolete hearsay information. Thus, the last record of the species appears to be the report of Père Bernardin in 1687. The species probably became extinct during the 1690s.
