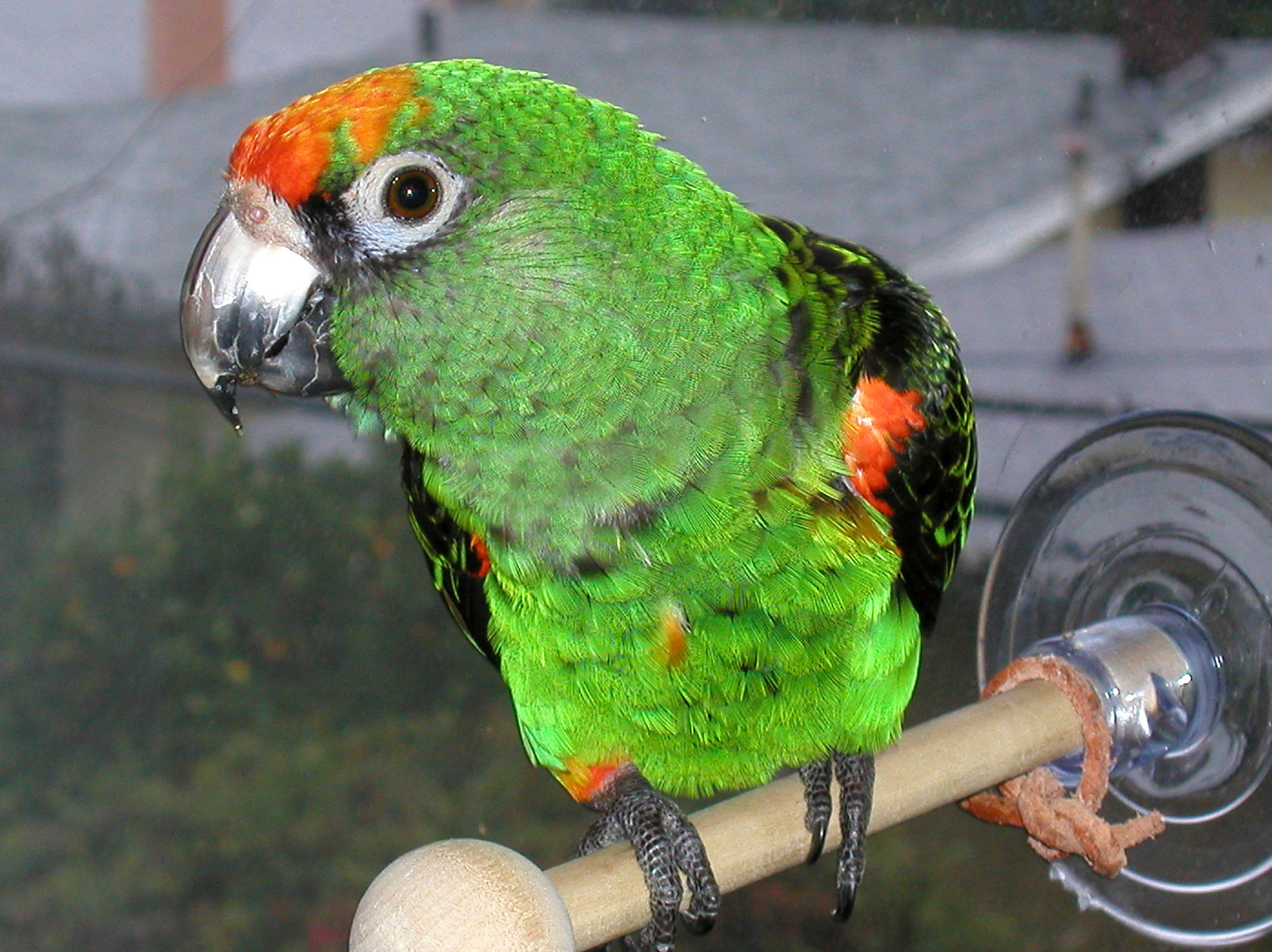
- Jardine's parrot (Poicephalus gulielmi)

Scientific classification
- Kingdom: Animalia
- Phylum: Chordata
- Class: Aves
- Order: Psittaciformes
- Family: Psittacidae
- Subfamily: Psittacinae; Rafinesque, 1815

Genera
- †Bavaripsitta; †Xenopsitta; Psittacus; Poicephalus

= Psittacinae =

Afrotropical parrots

Subfamily of birds

Psittacinae (Afrotropical parrots, African parrots, or Old World parrots) is a subfamily of parrots, native to sub-Saharan Africa, which include twelve species and two extant genera. Among the species is the iconic grey parrot.

The Poicephalus are usually green birds with different colored heads; the larger Psittacus are light grey with red tails.

African parrots (at least the grey parrot) have been known in Europe since Roman times.

The African parrots, unlike their Neotropical cousins, are polyphyletic: Agapornis of Africa and Madagascar was found to be the sister group to Loriculus of Australasia and Indo-Malayasia and together they clustered with the Australasian Loriinae, Cyclopsittini and Melopsittacus. Poicephalus and Psittacus from mainland Africa formed the sister group of the Neotropical Arinae and Coracopsis from Madagascar and adjacent islands may be the closest relative of Psittrichas from New Guinea.

== Taxonomy ==
This subfamily, together with its sister subfamily Arinae of Neotropical parrots, constitutes the family Psittacidae, one of three families of true parrots.

| Image | Genus | Living species |
|---|---|---|
| | Psittacus Linnaeus, 1758 | P. erithacus, grey parrot; P. timneh, Timneh parrot |
| | Poicephalus Swainson, 1837 | P. robustus, Cape parrot; P. fuscicollis, brown-necked parrot; P. f. fuscicollis, (nominate subspecies); P. f. suahelicus, grey-headed parrot (subspecies); P. gulielmi, Jardine's parrot also known as the red-fronted parrot; P. meyeri, Meyer's parrot; P. rueppellii, Rüppell's parrot; P. cryptoxanthus, brown-headed parrot; P. rufiventris, red-bellied parrot; P. senegalus, Senegal parrot; P. flavifrons, yellow-fronted parrot; P. crassus, Niam-Niam parrot |

Traditionally, the genus Coracopsis (vasa parrots) is included in this subfamily, but recent molecular studies show that they are within a different subfamily.

An extinct prehistoric monotypic genus Bavaripsitta has been described.
