= Xenopsitta =

Xenopsitta Temporal range: Early Miocene

Scientific classification
- Kingdom: Animalia
- Phylum: Chordata
- Class: Aves
- Order: Psittaciformes
- Family: Psittacidae
- Subfamily: Psittacinae
- Tribe: Psittacini
- Genus: †Xenopsitta; Mlikovsky, 1998
- Species: †X. fejfari

Binomial name
- †Xenopsitta fejfari Mlikovsky, 1998

Extinct genus of birds

Xenopsitta is an extinct parrot genus known from a fossil tarsometatarsus in early Miocene deposits at Merkur, in western Bohemia of the Czech Republic, and described by Jiri Mlikovsky in 1998. The type species is Xenopsitta fejfari. The genus name derives from Ancient Greek ξένος (xénos), meaning "strange", and ψιττακός (psittakós), meaning "parrot". The specific epithet honours Czech palaeontologist Oldrich Fejfar. It was described as a small parrot with a short and robust tarsometatarsus resembling the tarsometatarsi of large African parrots in the genera Psittacus, Poicephalus and Coracopsis.
