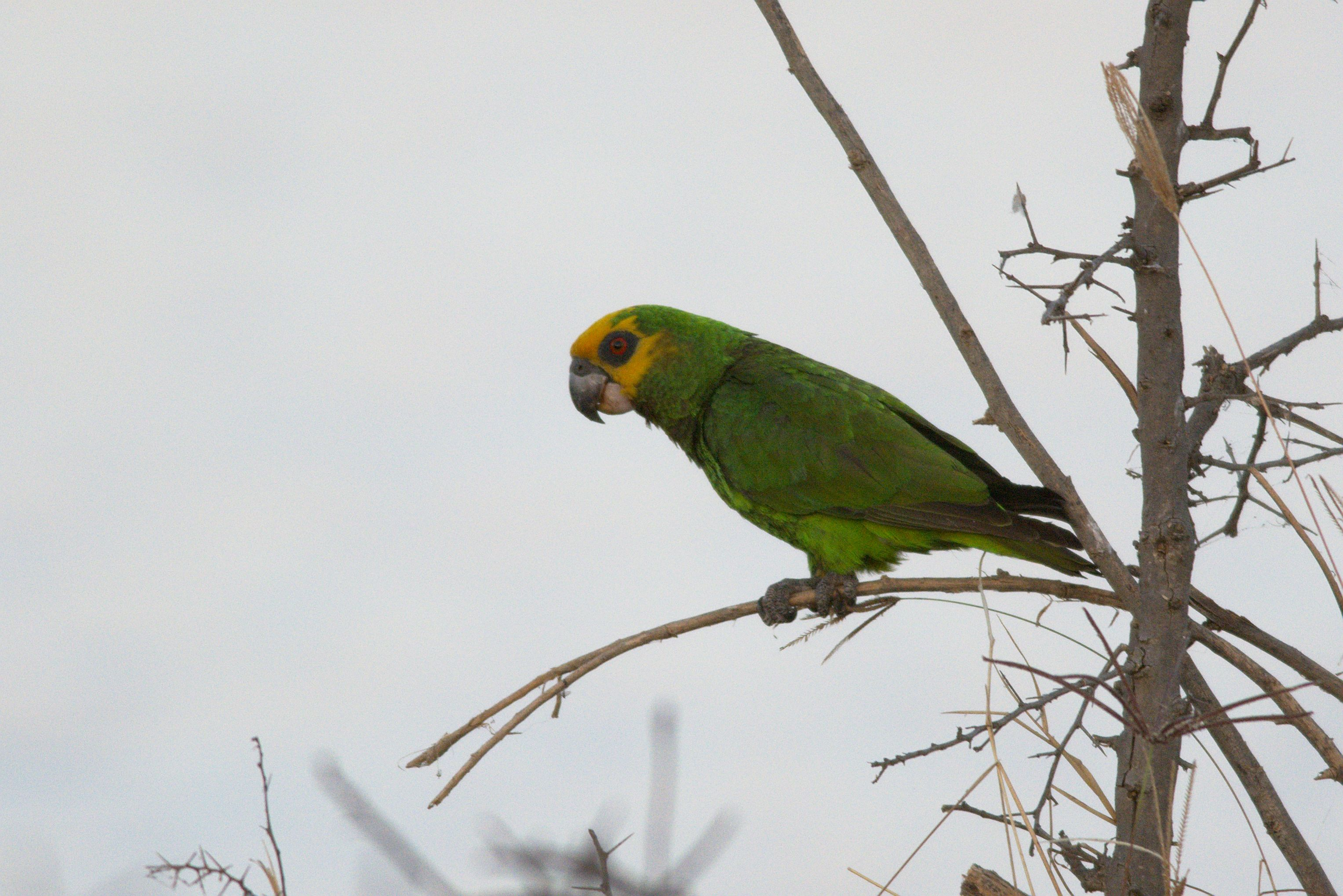
- Adult in Ethiopia

Conservation status
- Least Concern (IUCN 3.1)

Scientific classification
- Kingdom: Animalia
- Phylum: Chordata
- Class: Aves
- Order: Psittaciformes
- Family: Psittacidae
- Genus: Poicephalus
- Species: P. flavifrons

Binomial name
- Poicephalus flavifrons (Rüppell, 1842)

= Yellow-fronted parrot =

Species of bird

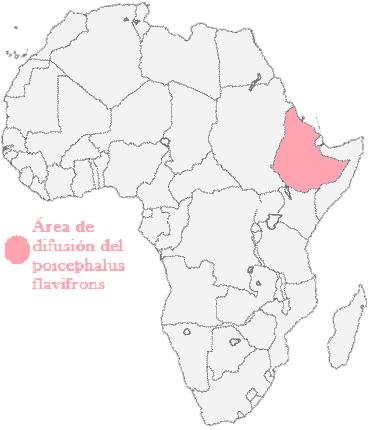

The yellow-fronted parrot (Poicephalus flavifrons) is a parrot endemic to the Ethiopian Highlands. It is a mostly green with a yellow head. Relatively little is known about this bird.

== Description ==
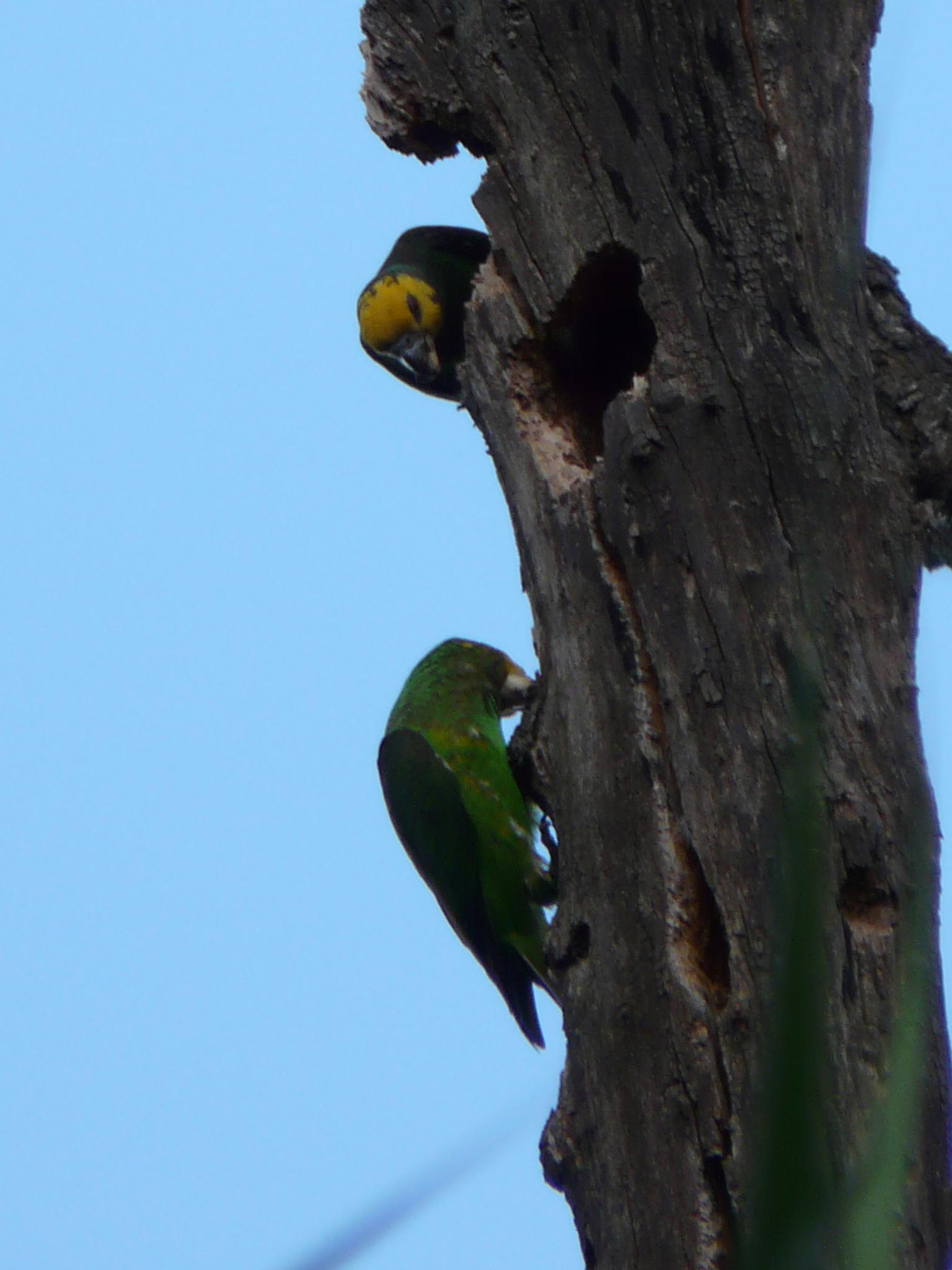
Adult (above) and juvenile (below) on an island in Lake Tana, Ethiopia

The yellow-fronted parrot is about 28 centimetres (11 in) long and is mostly green with the upper parts being a darker green, the tail being olive-brown, and the legs a dark grey-brown. The face is orange-yellow. When two subspecies are recognized, the nominate is believed to have yellow to its head and face, while in P. f. aurantiiceps some of the yellow is replaced with orange. The upper beak is brownish-grey and the lower beak is bone coloured, the irises are orange-red, and bare eye-rings and cere are grey. Male and female adults have identical external appearance. Juveniles are duller than the adults with a mostly grey head, brown irises, and only a small amount of yellow on the front of the face including on the forehead.

== Range ==
This parrot is endemic to the Ethiopian Highlands at about 1,000–3,000 metres (3,300–9,800 ft) above sea level. When two subspecies are recognized, the nominate is found in the highlands around Lake Tana and also in central Ethiopia, and P. f. aurantiiceps is found in southwestern Ethiopia. It lives in forest habitats, unlike most other Poicephalus parrots apart from the Cape and red-fronted parrot superspecies complex.

== Aviculture ==
The yellow-fronted parrot was unknown in aviculture until recently. The first thoroughly documented and published successful captive breeding of the Yellow-fronted Parrot (Poicephalus flavifrons) was achieved in 2012 by Daniel Jedlička, a Czech aviculturist. The breeding and subsequent observations were documented in specialist avicultural journals in the United Kingdom, Germany, the Netherlands, Australia, France and the Czech Republic. These publications describe reproductive behaviour, nesting, egg incubation, parental care, chick development and long-term observations in captivity. An editorial note published in the Czech journal Exota in 2024 states that the 2012 breeding represented the first successful captive breeding of the species under human care.

== Taxonomy ==
German naturalist Eduard Rüppell first described the yellow-fronted parrot in 1845. Its species name is derived from the Latin words flavus "yellow", and frons "forehead". It is also known as the yellow-faced parrot. Most recent authorities treat it as monotypic, but some recognized two slightly different subspecies, P. f. flavifrons and P. f. aurantiiceps.

== Cited texts ==
- Forshaw, Joseph M. (2006). Parrots of the World; an Identification Guide. Illustrated by Frank Knight. Princeton University Press. ISBN 978-0-691-09251-5.
