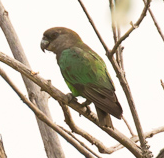
- A Niam-Niam parrot in its natural habitat.

Conservation status
- Least Concern (IUCN 3.1)

Scientific classification
- Kingdom: Animalia
- Phylum: Chordata
- Class: Aves
- Order: Psittaciformes
- Family: Psittacidae
- Genus: Poicephalus
- Species: P. crassus

Binomial name
- Poicephalus crassus (Sharpe, 1884)

= Niam-Niam parrot =

Species of bird

The Niam-Niam parrot (Poicephalus crassus) is a parrot nearly endemic to the Central African Republic, of the genus Poicephalus. It is a mostly green parrot with a grey-brown head and orange irises. The Niam Niam is one of the world's most poorly-known parrots, with little known of its conservation status, and was one of the last unphotographed birds in Africa until 2017.

== Description ==
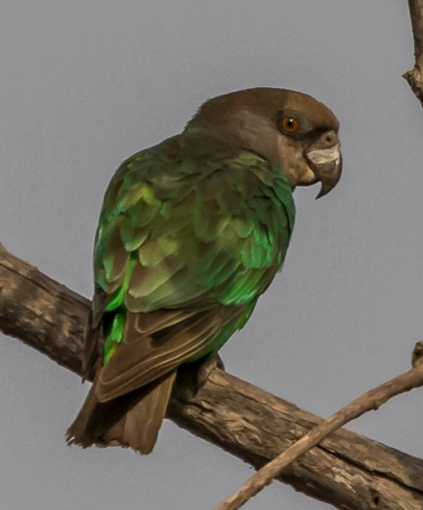
P. crassus have grey-brown heads, pale lower beaks, orange irises, and green bodies.

Niam-Niam parrots are not known to be sexually dimorphic. This bird can be identified by a grey-brown head and breast, green belly and upper parts, green underwings, pale lower beak and orange eyes. Unlike other parrots in the genus Poicephalus, Niam-Niam parrots lack yellow under their wings.

== Distribution and habitat ==
P. crassus has a large range extending across northern-central western Africa, from eastern Cameroon and southwestern Chad across the Central African Republic and extreme northern DRC into the southwestern edge of Sudan. Distribution and population of this parrot are currently unknown, and the conservation status of this bird is of least concern because it is not known to be globally threatened and does not approach a small enough range for a higher conservation status.

Most of the range of the Niam-Niam parrot is located in the Central African Republic and thus the species enjoys both plateau savannah and highly diverse forests.

Poicephalus parrots tend to be arboreal, resting and nesting in trees located within their territory.

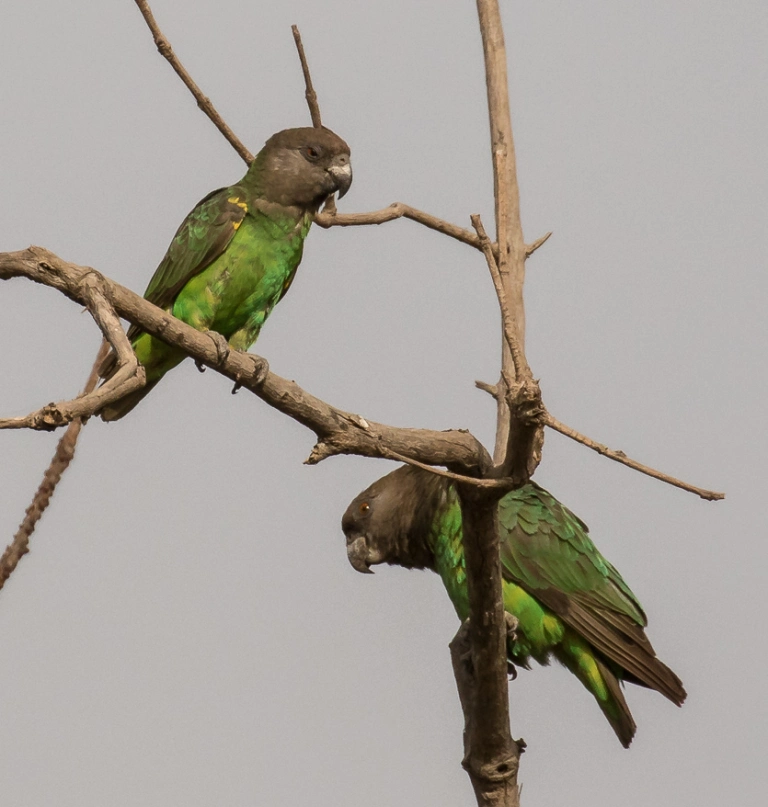
A Meyer's parrot (left) and a Niam-Niam parrot (right). The Meyer's parrot is smaller than the Niam-Niam. The Niam-Niam lacks yellow plumage.

== Lifespan ==
Though the average lifespan of a wild Niam-Niam Parrot is currently unknown, related parrots in Poicephalus, such as the Senegal parrot and Meyer's parrot, live on average for 20–30 years in the wild and up to 50 years or more in captivity.

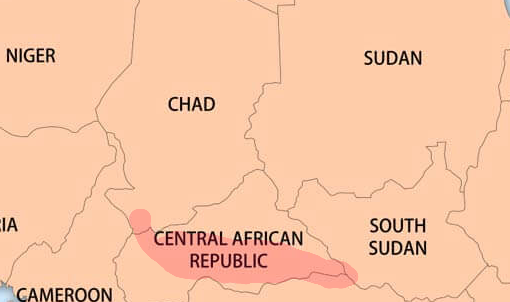
This is the approximate range of the Niam-Niam parrot in central Africa.

== Diet ==
Poicephalus parrots feed on a wide range of food. Seeds, fruit, leaves of a variety of trees and shrubs, nectar, insects, maize, and millet have all been observed to be part of their diet. Farmers may consider these parrots as pests for destruction of orchards and crops.

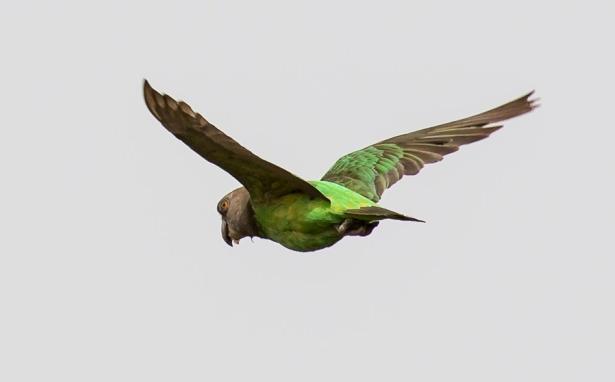
The Niam-Niam parrot does not have yellow underwings like many other species of Poicephalus do.
