= Bavaripsitta =

Bavaripsitta Temporal range: Early Miocene

Scientific classification
- Kingdom: Animalia
- Phylum: Chordata
- Class: Aves
- Order: Psittaciformes
- Family: Psittacidae
- Subfamily: Psittacinae
- Genus: †Bavaripsitta; Mayr & Göhlich, 2004
- Species: †B. ballmanni

Binomial name
- †Bavaripsitta ballmanni Mayr & Göhlich, 2004

Extinct genus of birds

Bavaripsitta ballmanni is a prehistoric parrot described from a fossil tarsometatarsus found in middle Miocene freshwater deposits in the Nördlinger Ries of western Bavaria in Southern Germany. It is the only species in the genus Bavaripsitta. The generic name derives from "Bavaria", and a diminutive form of the Latin for "parrot". The specific epithet honours Peter Ballmann, who first recognised the described material as coming from a parrot, for his work on the fossil birds of Nördlinger Ries.
