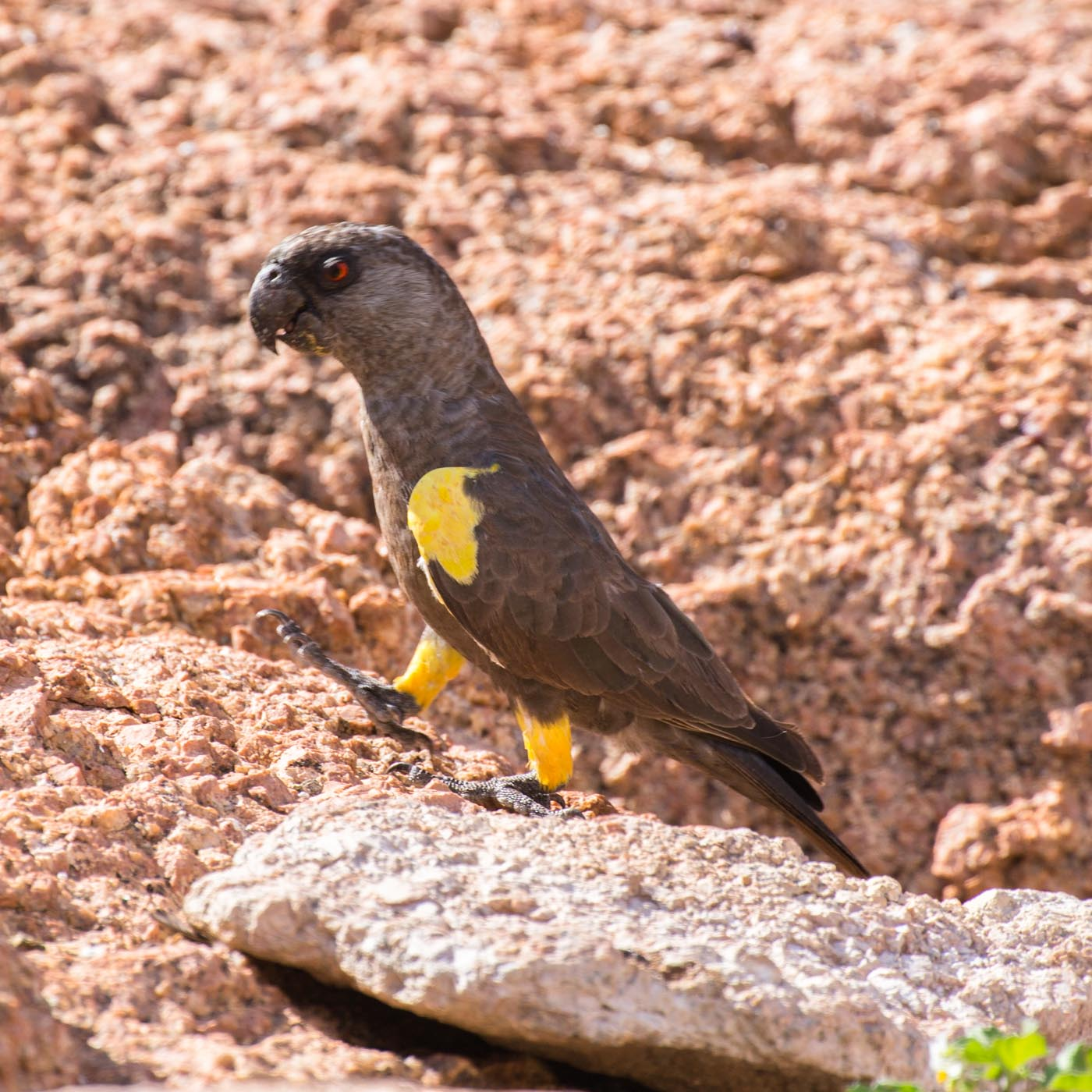

Conservation status
- Least Concern (IUCN 3.1)

Scientific classification
- Kingdom: Animalia
- Phylum: Chordata
- Class: Aves
- Order: Psittaciformes
- Family: Psittacidae
- Genus: Poicephalus
- Species: P. rueppellii

Binomial name
- Poicephalus rueppellii (G.R. Gray, 1849)

= Rüppell's parrot =

Rueppell's parrot

Species of bird

Rüppell's parrot (Poicephalus rueppellii) or Rueppell's parrot, is a bird that is endemic to southwestern Africa from central Namibia to southwest Angola. It lives in savanna where there are trees or in dry woodland. It is more common near streams or rivers. The name commemorates the German naturalist and explorer Eduard Rüppell.

== Description ==
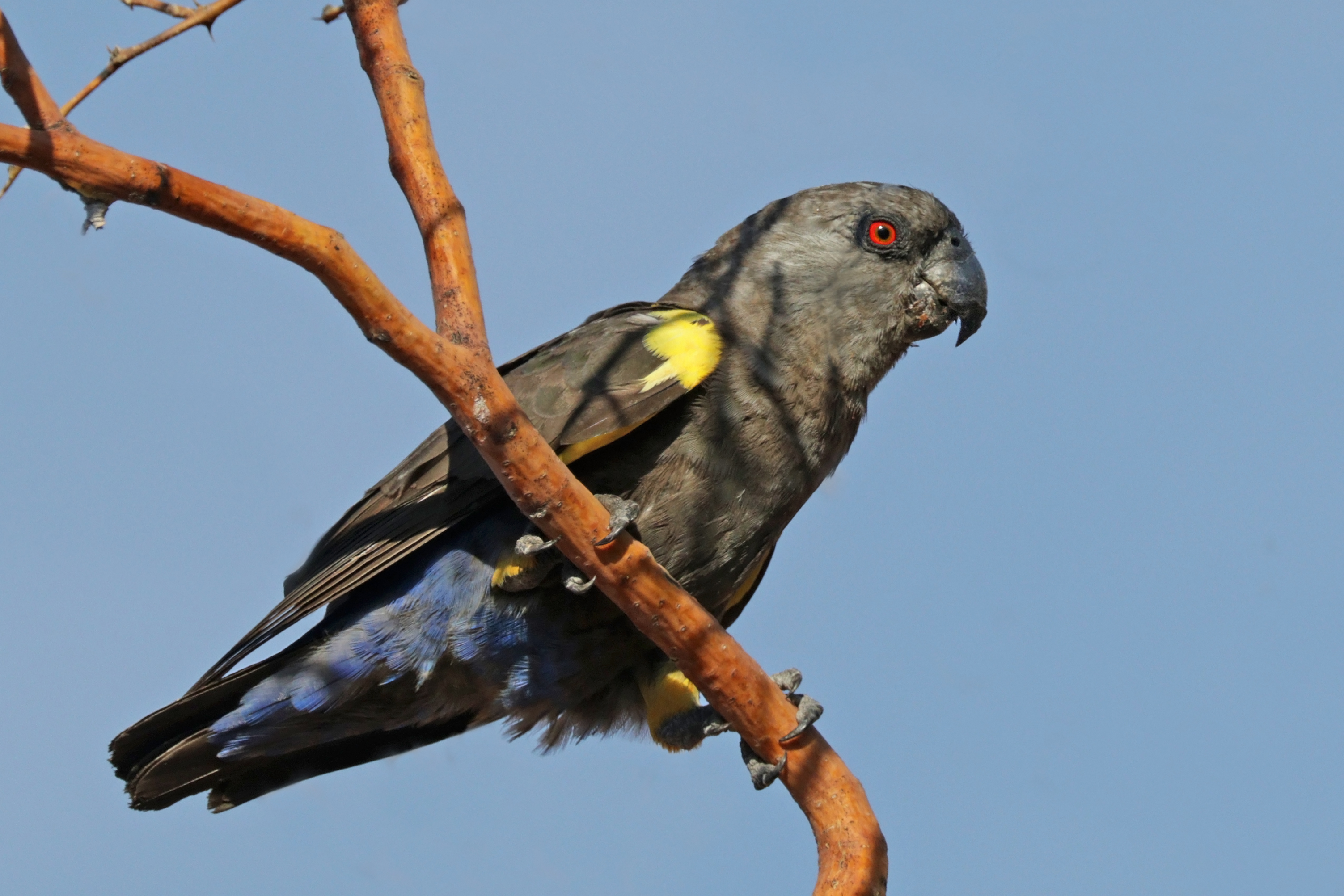
female bird

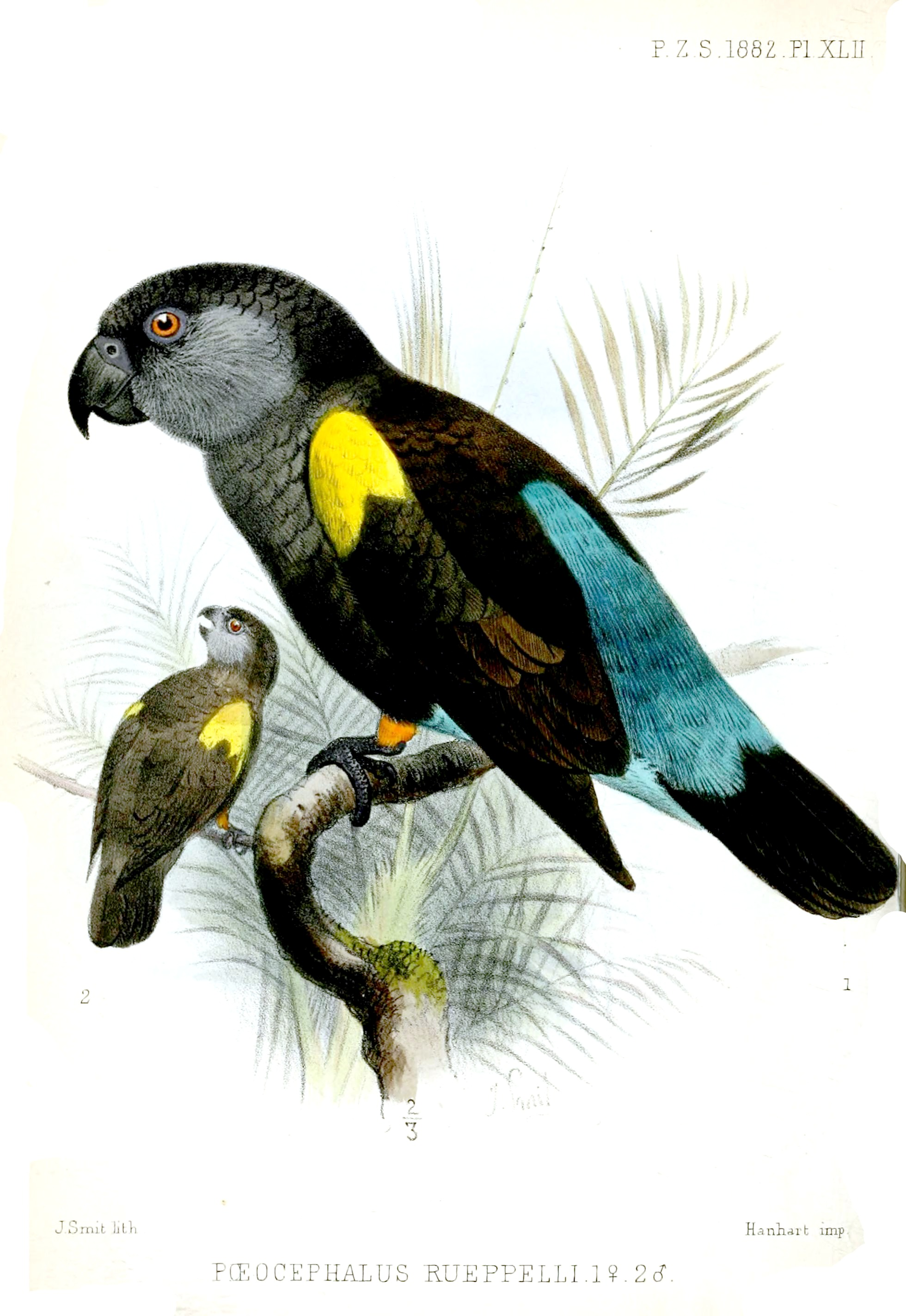
Old painting, female in foreground

Rüppell's parrot is 22–25 cm (8.7–9.8 in) long and weighs 121–156 g (4.3–5.5 oz). It has an overall black color. Both adult male and female birds have some yellow feathers on the leading edge of the wings, and yellow feathers covering their upper legs; in immature birds, the yellow is dull or missing. It is sexually dimorphic; adult female birds have blue feathers on the lower back and the rump, while male birds lose this blue feather coloration as they become mature.

== Diet ==
Ruppell's parrot eats mainly seeds, flowers, leaves, arthropods, and bark. It has been found that during the rainy seasons they prefer to eat flowers and insects. Consistently they eat Terminalia pruniodies and occasionally they also eat fruit, preferring softer more tender ones.

== Breeding ==
Rüppell's parrot nests in tree cavities. The eggs are white and there are usually three or four in a clutch. The female incubates the eggs for about 28 days and the chicks leave the nest about 68 days after hatching.

== Status ==
It is a protected species, listed on CITES appendix II.
