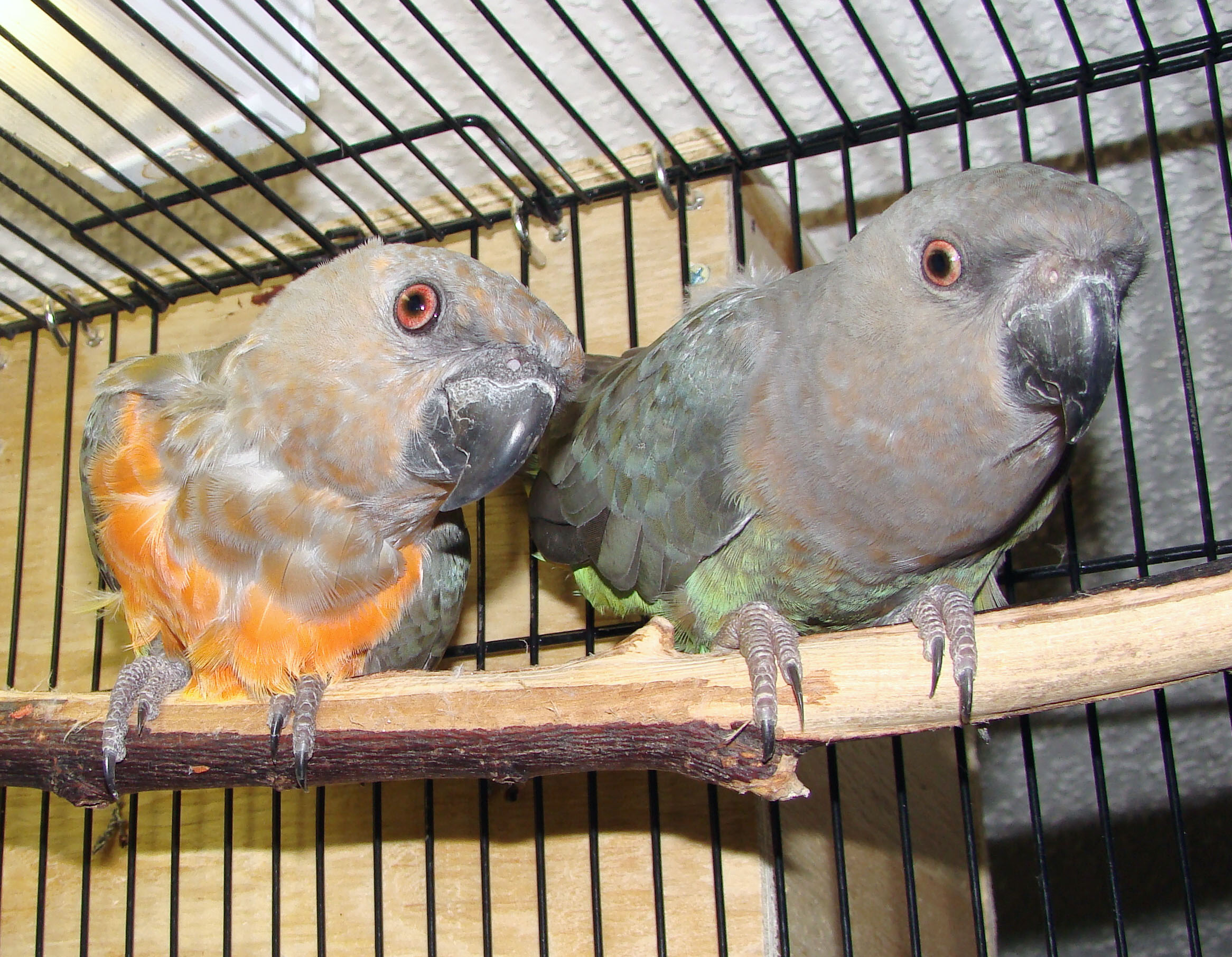
- Male (left) and female (right)

Conservation status
- Least Concern (IUCN 3.1)

Scientific classification
- Kingdom: Animalia
- Phylum: Chordata
- Class: Aves
- Order: Psittaciformes
- Family: Psittacidae
- Genus: Poicephalus
- Species: P. rufiventris

Binomial name
- Poicephalus rufiventris (Rüppell, 1842)

= Red-bellied parrot =

Species of bird

The red-bellied parrot (Poicephalus rufiventris) is a small African parrot about 23 cm (9 in) long of the genus Poicephalus. The genus Poicephalus has the greatest quantity of species and is widely spread in Africa. It is a mostly greenish and grey parrot. Males have a bright orange belly and females have a greenish belly.

== Description ==
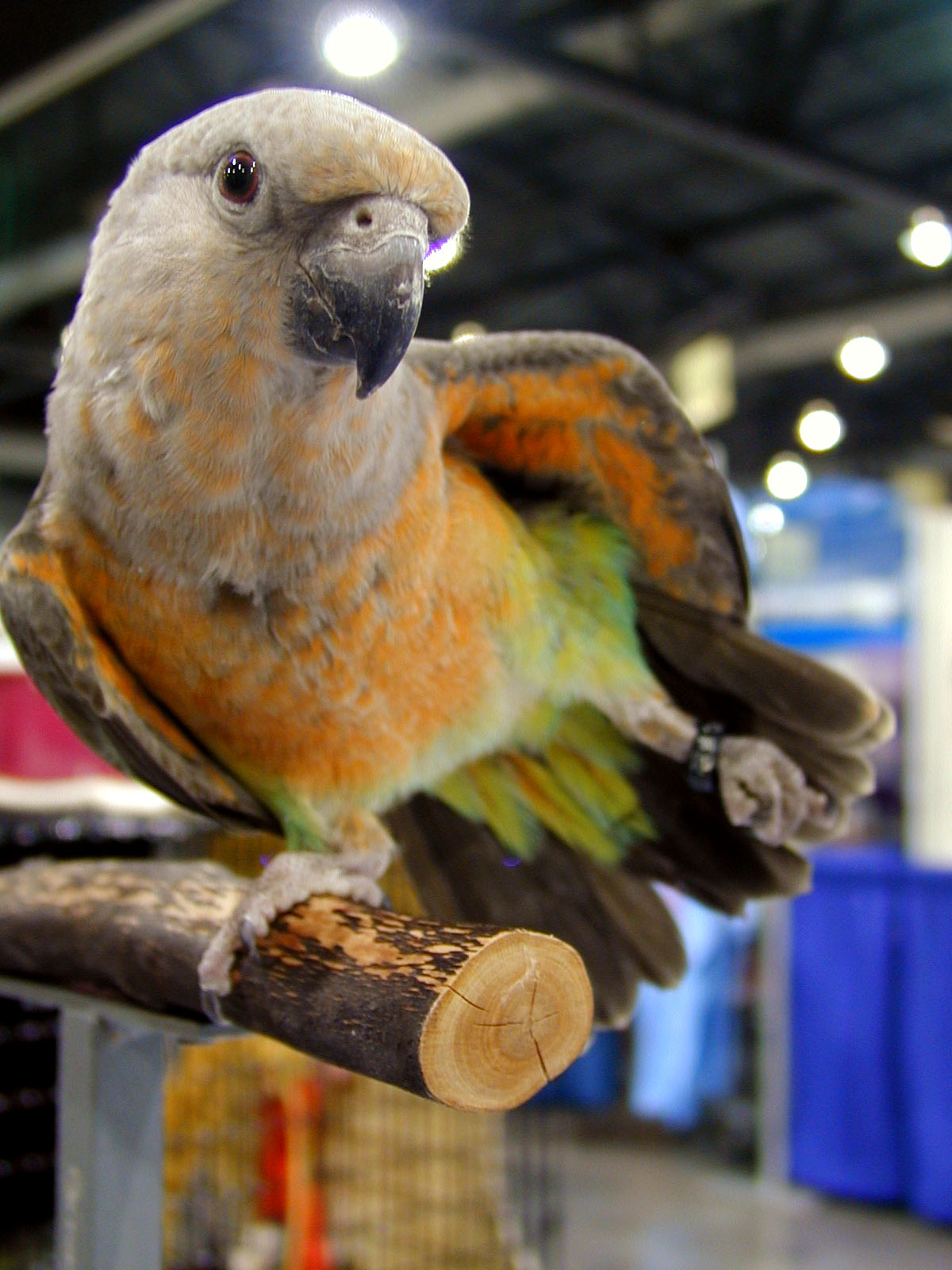
A juvenile male stretching. Note dark irises typical of juveniles.

The red-bellied parrot is a small parrot about 23 cm (9 in) long and weights 140 g (5 oz). It is a mostly greenish and grey bird with the green being more prominent over its lower surfaces and the grey more prominent over its upper surfaces. Adult birds have green feathers covering the upper portions of their legs, red irises and dark grey beaks. The species is sexually dimorphic; Typically, males have a bright orange lower chest and abdomen, whilst adult females are greenish on these lower areas. The dimorphism occurs from a young age and is seen even in young chicks still in the nest. The red-bellied parrot eats seed, fruit kernels, flowers, nectar, and periodically leaves, bark, and juice from hard fruits. Although the name red-bellied parrot implies that the parrot has hints of red, the word for the color orange was not introduced into the English language until after the fruit orange was discovered and named, so some animals which are colored orange by our current definition were named red due to the fact that a word for the color orange didn't exist in English.

== Breeding ==
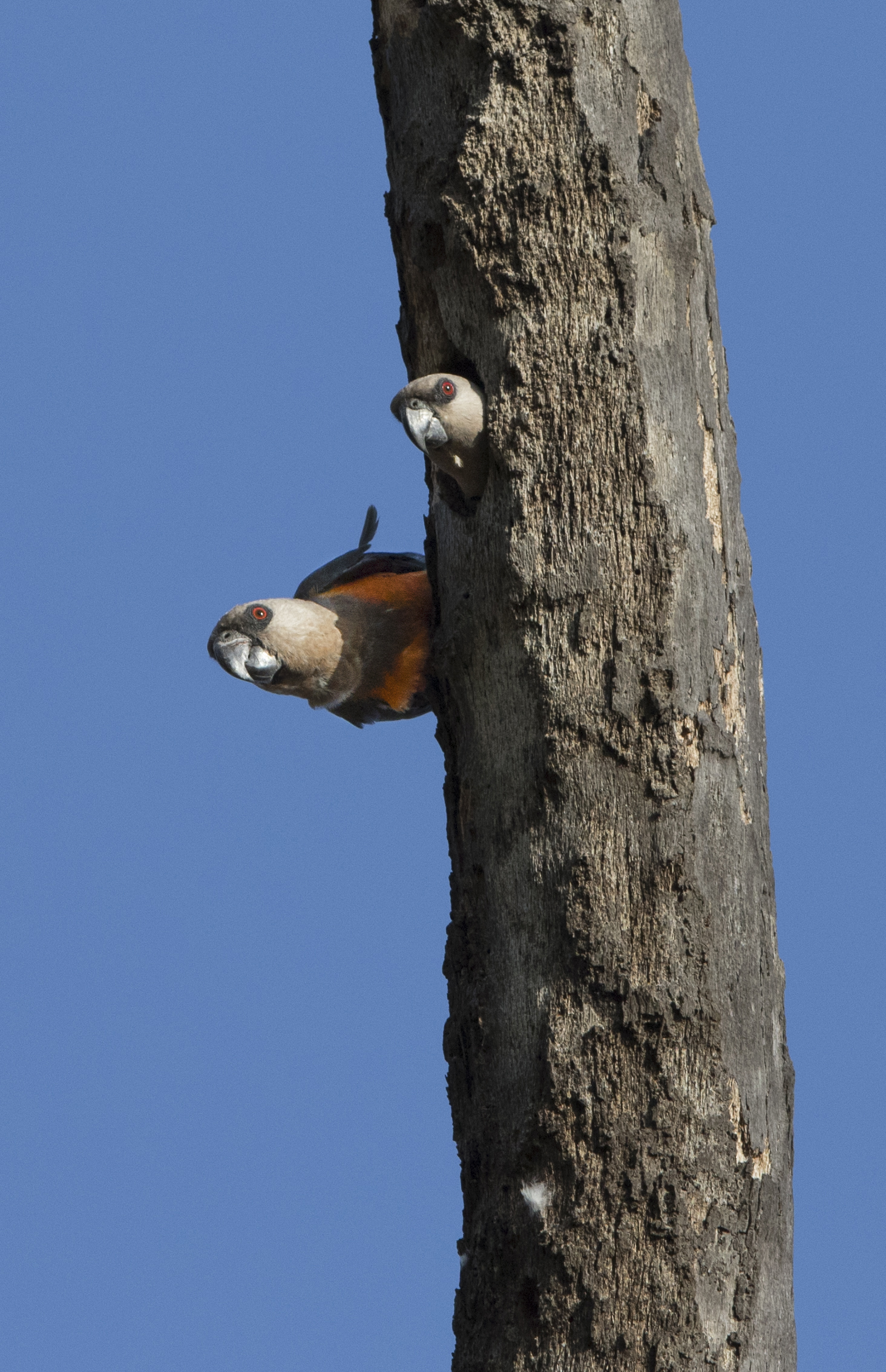
A pair of red-bellied parrots in the Samburu National Reserve, Kenya. The male (outside) has built a nest for the female (inside)

The red-bellied parrot nests in tree cavities. The eggs are white and there are usually three in a clutch. The female incubates the eggs for about 28 days and the chicks leave the nest about 63 days after hatching.
