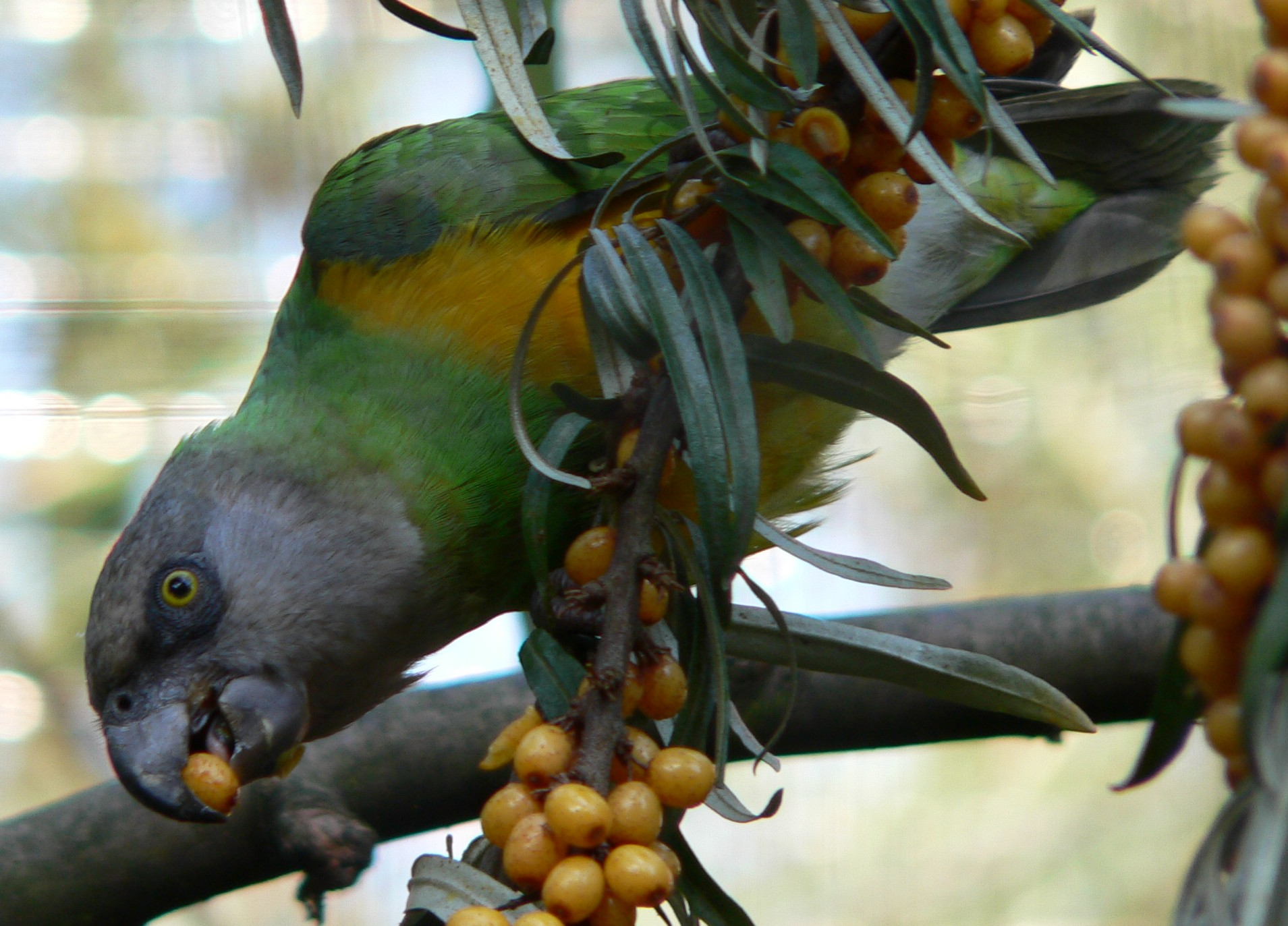
- Senegal parrot eating fruit

Scientific classification
- Kingdom: Animalia
- Phylum: Chordata
- Class: Aves
- Order: Psittaciformes
- Family: Psittacidae
- Subfamily: Psittacinae
- Genus: Poicephalus; Swainson, 1837

Type species
- Psittacus senegalus Linnaeus, 1766

= Poicephalus =

Poicephalus parrots

Genus of birds

The genus Poicephalus belongs to the subfamily Psittacinae of the true parrots (Psittacidae) and comprises ten species of parrots native to various regions of the Afrotropical realm, which encompasses Sub-Saharan Africa, ranging from Senegal in the west, Ethiopia in the east, and to South Africa in the south. Like lovebirds (Agapornis) and vasa parrots (Coracopsis), the latter being endemic to Madagascar, the Poicephalus parrots are typical specimens of Afrotropical zoogeography. Several of the species exist in slightly different forms, or subspecies.

Poicephalus parrots have been kept as pets and companion birds for centuries, the Senegal parrot perhaps being the most famous species. The trade in this species most likely began in the early 19th century, when Senegal parrots first appeared as companion birds in Europe. Alongside African grey parrots, Senegal parrots still range among the mostly frequently imported parrots from Africa.

== Taxonomy ==
The genus Poicephalus was introduced by the English naturalist William Swainson in 1837. Swainson listed several species in the genus but did not specify the type species. In 1840 the English zoologist George Gray designated the type as Psittacus senegalensis Swainson, a junior synonym of Psittacus senegalus Linaeus, the senegal parrot. The name is from the Ancient Greek phaios "grey" and -kephalos "headed".

The genus contains ten species.

- Red-fronted parrot, or Jardine's parrot, P. gulielmi
- Yellow-fronted parrot, P. flavifrons
- Brown-necked parrot, or uncape parrot, P. fuscicollis
- Cape parrot, or Levaillant's parrot, P. robustus
- Meyer's parrot, P. meyeri
- Rüppell's parrot, P. rueppellii
- Brown-headed parrot, P. cryptoxanthus
- Niam-Niam parrot, P. crassus
- Senegal parrot, P. senegalus
- Red-bellied parrot, P. rufiventris

== Appearance ==
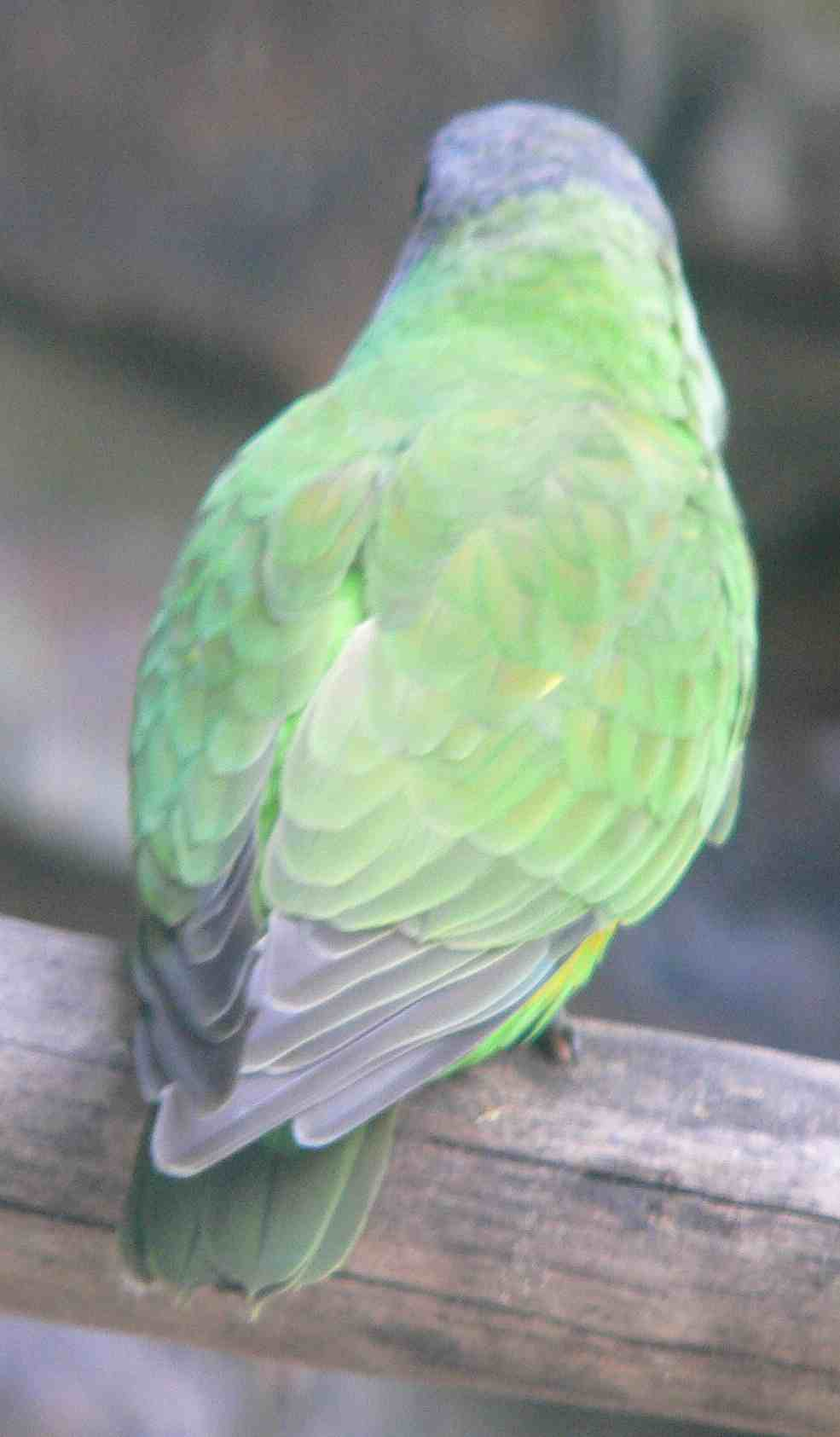
The wing tips of the long-winged parrots reach almost to the end of the tail plumage.

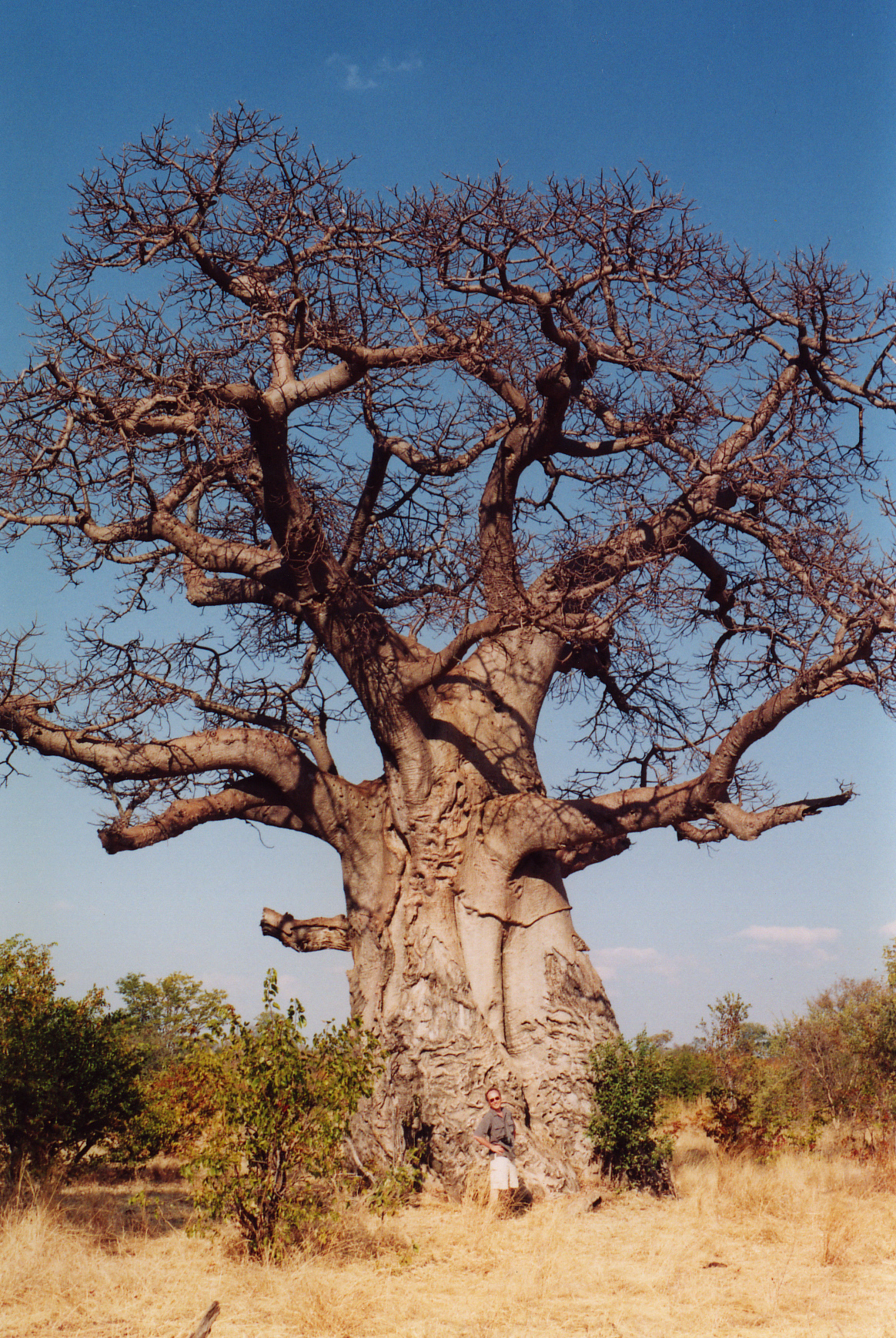
Parrots often use African baobabs as a nesting tree.

Members of the Poicephalus genus are stocky birds with short broad tails and relatively large heads and beaks that often differ in color from their trunks. Although they are parrots with rectrices of medium length, their pinion feathers reach down almost to the end of the rectrices, making their wings appear to be remarkably long.

According to H. Strunden, Poicephalus, from Ancient Greek, means "grey head" (poliós = grey and kephalé = head).

Most species in the Poicephalus genus are predominantly green. However, grey is also common, and the feathers on their heads frequently vary in colour from the rest of the plumage. Senegal parrots and brown-headed parrots for example have blackish or dark brown heads, while the head plumage of brown-necked and Cape parrots is grey-brown to silver-grey. With the exception of the red-fronted parrot, the different colours of head and body plumage of these four species do not overlap or blend. The red-fronted parrot only shows a more fluent transition, with merely the slate grey ear patches and the red front and crown clearly set apart. Another variation is found in male Rüppell's parrots, whose brown plumage is overlaid with silver-grey at the ear patches and the top of their heads, with only a tinge of green on the top-side plumage. Female Rüppell's parrots, on the other hand, have a bright blue back section, rump, and upper tail coverts, while the feathers on their lower ventral region and vent are a dull blue.

Several of the species show marked sexual dimorphism, Rüppell's parrots, brown-necked parrots, cape parrots, and red-bellied parrots are dimorphic, the other species of Poicephalus parrots cannot be distinguished by the colours of their plumage. The difference is especially clear in red-bellied parrots, where males have red or bright orange plumage on breast, belly and below their wings while the feathers of females are all grey-brown in these areas.

The smallest species in the genus is the Meyer's parrot, with adults reaching a body-length of only 22 centimeters (≈ 8,66 in.) and weighing approximately 120 g (≈ 4,23 oz). The largest species, the Cape parrot, by contrast, is usually almost as large as an African grey parrot, adult males reaching a size of 32 centimeters (≈ 12,6 in.) and a weight of about 400 g (≈ 14,1 oz).

Many Poicephalus parrots have bulky heads and powerful beaks, the colour of which varying with the species. While brown-headed parrots and Niam-Niam parrots have a grey upper mandible and an off-white lower one, other species have a homogeneously grey-coloured beak or a horn-coloured one with a darker tip.

The Cape parrot stands out with a particularly sturdy beak in relation to its overall size which it needs to obtain its main food source, the hard-shelled fruit of Podocarpus trees. British parrot specialist Rosemary Low has pointed out that, among the genus, only the Cape parrot is able to crack open walnuts with its beak. Except for macaws, this is a rare ability among parrots in general.

== Distribution ==
All ten species of Poicephalus parrots live in Africa, south of the Sahara. Their natural habitat ranges from the coastal regions of the Red Sea and the Gulf of Aden in the north to the Drakensberg in South Africa and the northern edge of the Kalahari Desert and the Namib in the south. Thus Poicephalus parrots can be found in any tropical and subtropical habitat across Africa, except the high-altitude mountains, although they also live in the subtropical Afromontane regions and a geographical region where Kalahari desert and the South African Highveld merge. The Sahel and the two other deserts within their habitat (Namib and Kalahari Desert) are natural distribution boundaries because they are no appropriate biotopes for parrots. To the southeast, increasing deforestation limits their range. So much so that the Cape parrot populations, already considered one of the most threatened large parrot species of Africa, have become disjunct in an area reaching from the Eastern Cape Province to KwaZulu-Natal.

Poicephalus parrots have spread to only a few islands on the African shore; while brown-headed parrots can be found on Pemba Island in the Indian Ocean, and Senegal parrots occur on the Îles de Los off the Guinean coast, Poicephalus parrots have become extirpated from Zanzibar.

Normally, the distribution areas of the different Poicephalus species do not overlap but this may happen when food becomes scarce after longer periods of drought and the parrots are forced to migrate to find more abundant food sources. Then several different Poicephalus species can be found in one region. Other parrot species naturally occurring in the same distribution area as Poicephalus parrots include African grey parrots, African ring-necked parakeets, and different species of lovebirds like red-headed, black-collared, yellow-collared, rosy-faced, black-cheeked, black-winged, Fischer's, and Lilian's lovebirds.

== Habitat ==
With the exception of the Cape parrot, whose preferred food sources are Podocarpus and Celtis seeds, Poicephalus parrots are readily adaptable dietary generalists. This is why they were able to spread to such diverse habitats as lowland tropical rain forests, mangrove forests, rain as well as dry forests of different biomes, and the wooded parts of African savannahs.

Grey-headed parrots (P. f. suahelicus) and Meyer's parrots have settled in an especially wide range of different habitats. The natural distribution of the grey-headed parrot ranges from wooded lowland savannahs to humid high-altitude rainforests, up to altitudes of 4000 m. Meyer's parrots also occur in the moist forest regions of various life zones, as well as in shrub and grassland savannahs.

Occasionally, Poicephalus parrots can be observed in agricultural areas, where they feed on fruit and grain.

== Behaviour and ecology ==
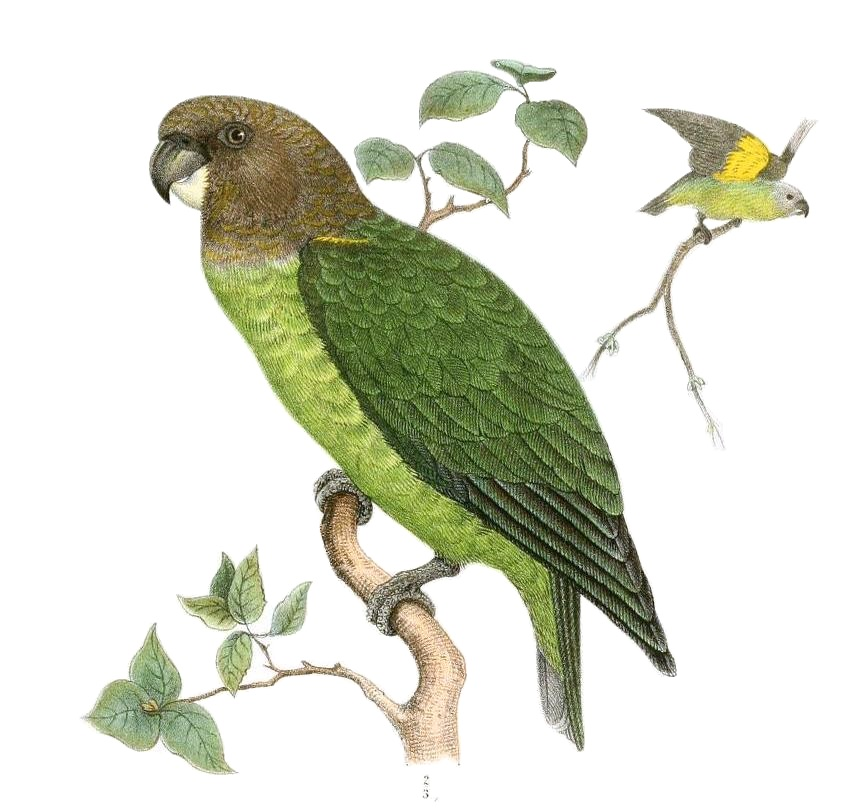
Pionias fuscicapillus from the book Die Vogel Ost-Afrikas (1870).

Although Poicephalus parrots are not related to the American Amazon parrots, they have come to occupy similar ecological niches and show some analogies in their behaviour.

Living mostly in small family groups consisting of adult birds and their young, Poicephalus parrots sometimes form loose larger groups with other families. If there is plenty of food available, those groups may comprise up to 100 birds.

Even though some groups of Poicephalus parrots sometimes cause losses in orchards, maize or millet fields near settlement areas, they are generally shy and keep away from humans.

Poicephalus parrots spend the nights in treetops, returning to the same roosting tree regularly. At dusk, they start preening before then leaving for their feeding grounds; loud calls usually announce the birds' departure. Depending on the food supplies available, Poicephalus parrots are able to cover large distances: brown-necked parrots have been known to fly ca. 80 km (≈ 50 miles) in search of food. Subpopulations of red-fronted parrots have been observed roosting in higher altitude areas before descending to their sources of food, overcoming a difference in altitude of about 300 m. After feeding in the morning, Poicephalus parrots often rest in treetops in the vicinity of the respective food source, alternately sleeping or dozing and preening. They return to their feeding grounds once more in the late afternoon before leaving for their nocturnal roosts.

== Diet ==
Most Poicephalus parrots are dietary generalists, feeding on seeds, fruit, and leaves of different kinds of trees and shrubs. Blossoms rich in nectar and accessory fruit are also part of their diet as well as insects, although the latter never make up a great part of their food. Because their diet does not contain enough water to cover the parrots' need, they require sources of water within their habitats.

The Cape parrot is a notable exception among the Poicephalus parrots since it is an oligophagous dietary specialist feeding mostly on the seeds of Podocarpus and Celtis trees. Apart from trapping and habitat loss, It is probably for this reasons that the Cape parrot is an endangered species, listed as "vulnerable" by the IUCN.

Some Poicephalus species like Senegal and Meyer's parrots are partial migrants, thus compensating for scarce or seasonally fluctuating food supplies. They only migrate out of breeding season.

== Breeding ==
At the earliest, Poicephalus parrots start breeding when they are three years old. Then they nest in natural tree-holes found in large trees such as African baobabs and carob trees, where their nesting sites are most commonly found. Cape parrots, however, prefer Podocarpus trees and red-bellied parrots are known to nest in cavities of termite mounds. No nesting materials are collected.

A clutch of eggs usually consists of two to four eggs, laid within one to four days and incubated solely by the female through 26 to 28 days. Meanwhile, the male feeds the female and stays close to the nesting site until some days after the chicks have hatched. As soon as the female no longer has to warm the chicks permanently, the male also begins to feed them. The hatchlings' weight could only be measured in captive breeding so far and is five (Meyer's parrot) to six (brown-headed parrot) gram (≈ 0,18 to 0,21 oz). The chicks are covered in white or light grey downy feathers and their usually rather noisy parents become more quiet and watchful while around the nest.

How long the non-captive hatchlings stay in the nest is poorly known, more precise observations of wild specimens are only available for Cape parrots and brown-necked parrots. Young Cape parrots remain in the nesting cavity for up to 79 days, while the brown-necked parrot chicks leave their home on the 69th day. Reliable data concerning Senegal and brown-headed parrots bear on the observation of captive parrots which revealed that the fledgling period of Senegal parrots varied between nine and eleven weeks while young brown-headed parrots left the nest during the twelfth week of their lives. The male kept feeding them until they were fifteen weeks old.

== Predators, parasites, and typical illnesses ==
Sitting females and nestlings are especially vulnerable to predation, e.g. by dasypeltes, boomslangs, monitor lizards like savannah and Nile monitors, baboons, civets, and mongooses. The African harrier-hawk likewise sometimes robs the nests, holding on to the entrance of the cavity with one claw and grabbing the nestlings with the other. The mentioned predators mostly capture eggs and fledgling birds, while adult birds may be hunted by eagles, hawks, falcons, and sparrowhawks of appropriate size.

The most common ectoparasites found on Poicephalus parrots are feather mites and bird lice that live on the birds' feathers and skin. Like other wild animals, Poicephalus parrots may be infested with internal parasites like Coccidia, Ascaridida, Capillaria nematodes, and Cestoda (tapeworms).

Little is known about diseases typical of wild Poicephalus parrots but the examination of Cape parrots and Rüppell's parrots found that parts of these populations are infected with the virus that causes the Psittacine beak and feather disease (PBFD). There is still no treatment available for this often fatal disease and although some birds may show no symptoms, they may nonetheless spread the virus they carry.

== Population ==
The population dynamics and conservation status of the various Poicephalus species are heterogeneous, ranging from "least concern" to "endangered". More extensive field studies have been undertaken only in South Africa and Namibia so far, hence the most reliable data come from those regions and the species and subspecies living there. According to the World Parrot Trust online encyclopedia, the numbers of most Poicephalus species remain unknown but are assumed to be stable, with the exception of red-fronted parrots, whose population seems to be decreasing. Hoppe and Welcke point out that data about the population development of Poicephalus parrots are often either inconsistent or obsolete, if they exist at all.

Whereas red-bellied parrots and Senegal parrots are apparently still rather frequent, some subspecies of otherwise stable species of Poicephalus parrots have become endangered due to habitat loss and trapping. This holds true for the Poicephalus gulielmi fantiensis subspecies of the red-fronted parrot, for example, which has come under threat because of extensive deforestation and trapping (although The Convention on the International Trade in Endangered Species (CITES) makes trade in such birds illegal).

There are as yet no reliable data concerning the Niam-Niam parrot native to the Chad and Central African Republic and the yellow-fronted parrot endemic to the Ethiopian Highlands. Because of intense deforestation in its habitat, the population of the yellow-fronted parrot is probably declining. Information regarding brown-headed parrots and Rueppell's parrots are contradictory. While some studies suggest that both species have become very rare all over their respective range, other studies claim that both species are declining in numbers but are not critically endangered yet.

Of those species where reliable data is available, the most critically endangered Poicephalus species is the Cape parrot which largely depends on Podocarpus seeds for his diet. With many areas of Podocarpus trees in decline due to forest clearance this species is threatened with extinction. In 2018, only 1.453 specimens of wild Cape parrots were counted, which might indicate a slight increase compared to 2004, even though the data come from different sources.

== Species ==
Species
Common and binomial names	Image	Description	Subspecies	Range
Senegal parrot (P. senegalus)		Grey head, green back and chest. Yellow, orange or red belly depending on subspecies.	Poicephalus senegalus versteri Poicephalus senegalus mesotypus	West Africa
Meyer's parrot (P. meyeri)		Green, yellow under wings. Six subspecies (including nominate) with variable yellow colouration.	Poicephalus meyeri saturatus Poicephalus meyeri matschiei Poicephalus meyeri transvaalensis Poicephalus meyeri reichenowi Poicephalus meyeri damarensis	Sub-Saharan Africa
Red-bellied parrot (P. rufiventris)		Mostly green and grey. Male has red belly.	none	Horn of Africa
Brown-headed parrot (P. cryptoxanthus)		Mostly green and grey. Yellow under wings.	Poicephalus crypoxanthus tanganyikae	East Africa
Red-fronted parrot (P. gulielmi)		Mostly green, variable amount of red on head and shoulders depending on subspecies.	Poicephalus gulielmi fantiensis Poicephalus gulielmi massaicus	African tropical rainforest
Cape parrot (P. robustus)		Mostly green, grey or brownish head and neck.	none	South Africa
Brown-necked parrot (P. fuscicollis)		Mostly green, grey or brownish head and neck.	Poicephalus fuscicollis suahelicus	Sub-Saharn Africa
Rüppell's parrot (P. rueppellii)		Overall dark brown colour, head is dark greyish, yellow on legs and leading edge of wings, female has blue rump and lower back.	none	Southern Africa
Yellow-fronted parrot (P. flavifrons)		Mostly green with a yellow head.	Poicephalus flavifrons aurantiiceps	Ethiopia
Niam-Niam parrot (P. crassus)		Mostly green with a brown head.	none	Central African Republic and adjacent areas

== Subspecies ==
The Cape parrot and red-fronted parrot form a superspecies complex.

== In aviculture and human care ==
The Senegal parrot, Meyer's parrot, red-bellied parrot, and the brown-headed parrot are popular as pets because they are easier to keep in apartments, being generally quieter and smaller than most other companion parrots. Some Poicephalus parrot species are rare and not known in captivity.

While some Poicephalus populations have come under pressure from habitat loss, others are affected by trapping for the pet trade. For example, while it is still listed as "least concern" on the IUCN Red List, the Senegal parrot is one of the species most frequently caught from the wild, with 735,775 birds recorded in international trade since 1981.
