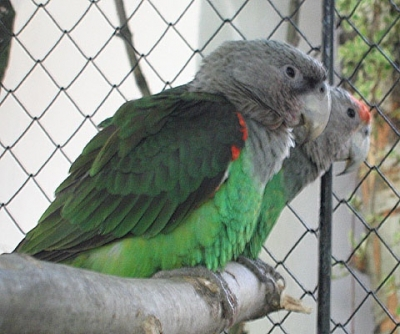
- A grey-headed parrot (Poicephalus fuscicollis suahelicus)

Conservation status
- Least Concern (IUCN 3.1)

Scientific classification
- Kingdom: Animalia
- Phylum: Chordata
- Class: Aves
- Order: Psittaciformes
- Family: Psittacidae
- Genus: Poicephalus
- Species: P. fuscicollis

Binomial name
- Poicephalus fuscicollis (Kuhl, 1820)

= Brown-necked parrot =

Species of bird

The brown-necked parrot (Poicephalus fuscicollis), sometimes known in aviculture as the uncape parrot, is a large Poicephalus parrot species endemic to Africa.

It consists of two subspecies: the savanna-dwelling brown-necked parrot (P. fuscicollis fuscicollis) and grey-headed parrot (P. f. suahelicus) subspecies. It formerly included the Cape parrot (now Poicephalus robustus) as a subspecies before the Cape parrot was re-classified as a distinct species.

== Taxonomy ==
German naturalist Heinrich Kuhl described the brown-necked parrot in his 1819 work Conspectus Psittacorum. Although unsure of its country of origin, he felt it was definitely a distinct species and related to the Cape parrot. The species name is from the Latin words fuscus "dark" and collum "neck".

South Africa-based ornithologist Phillip Clancey proposed the Cape and brown-necked parrots were separate species in 1997 based on the shape and size of the bill, head coloration and preferred habitat. Mike Perrin observed that species status would facilitate protection of the endangered Cape parrot. Genetic analysis of the three taxa published in 2015 supported the distinctness of brown-necked and cape parrots, showing that ancestors of the two had diverged between 2.13 and 2.67 million years ago—in the late Pliocene to early Pleistocene epoch. This period was a period of changes in climate, where grassland and forest were expanding and contracting, which led to isolation and eventually speciation of separate populations.

The old name for the three taxa was Cape parrot, with virtually all the individuals in captivity belonging to what became P. fuscicollis. Jean Pattison called them Uncape parrots because of this.

== Description ==
The largest member of its genus, the brown-necked parrot has a relatively large head and bill, and stocky build. It has a light grey head. The nominate subspecies fuscicollis has a bluer sheen to its plumage than suahelicus. The upperparts are yellow-green and underparts greenish.

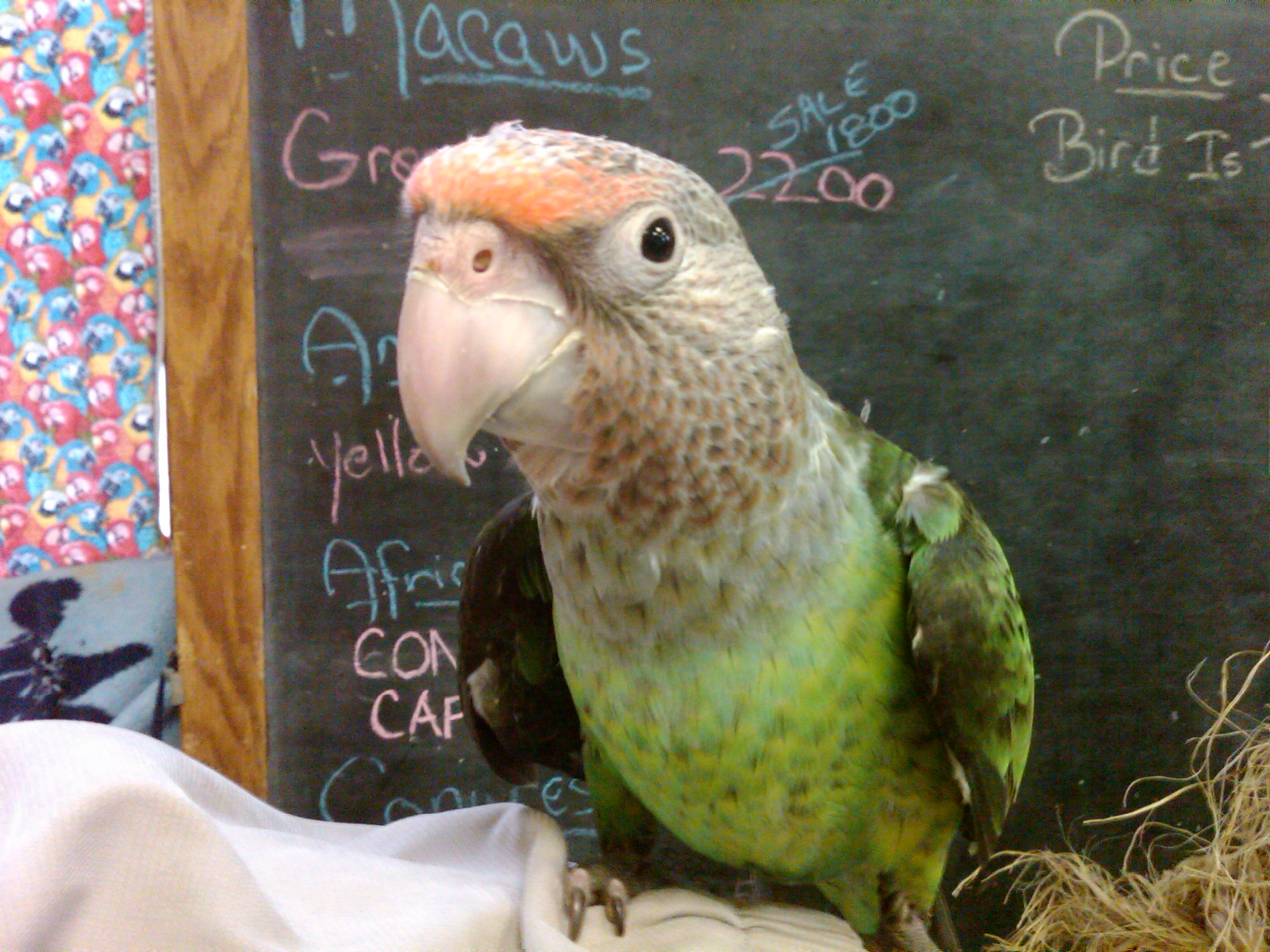
Juvenile grey-headed parrot

== Distribution ==
Subspecies fuscicollis is found in west Africa from Gambia and southern Senegal to Ghana and Togo. Locally common in places, it appears to have declined in Senegal and Gambia. Subspecies suahelicus is found in southern Africa from southern Congo and Tanzania to northern Namibia and south to northern South Africa.

== Aviculture ==
The species adapts readily to captivity and is seen in the pet trade. They are highly intelligent and are known for mimicking sounds as well as human speech.
