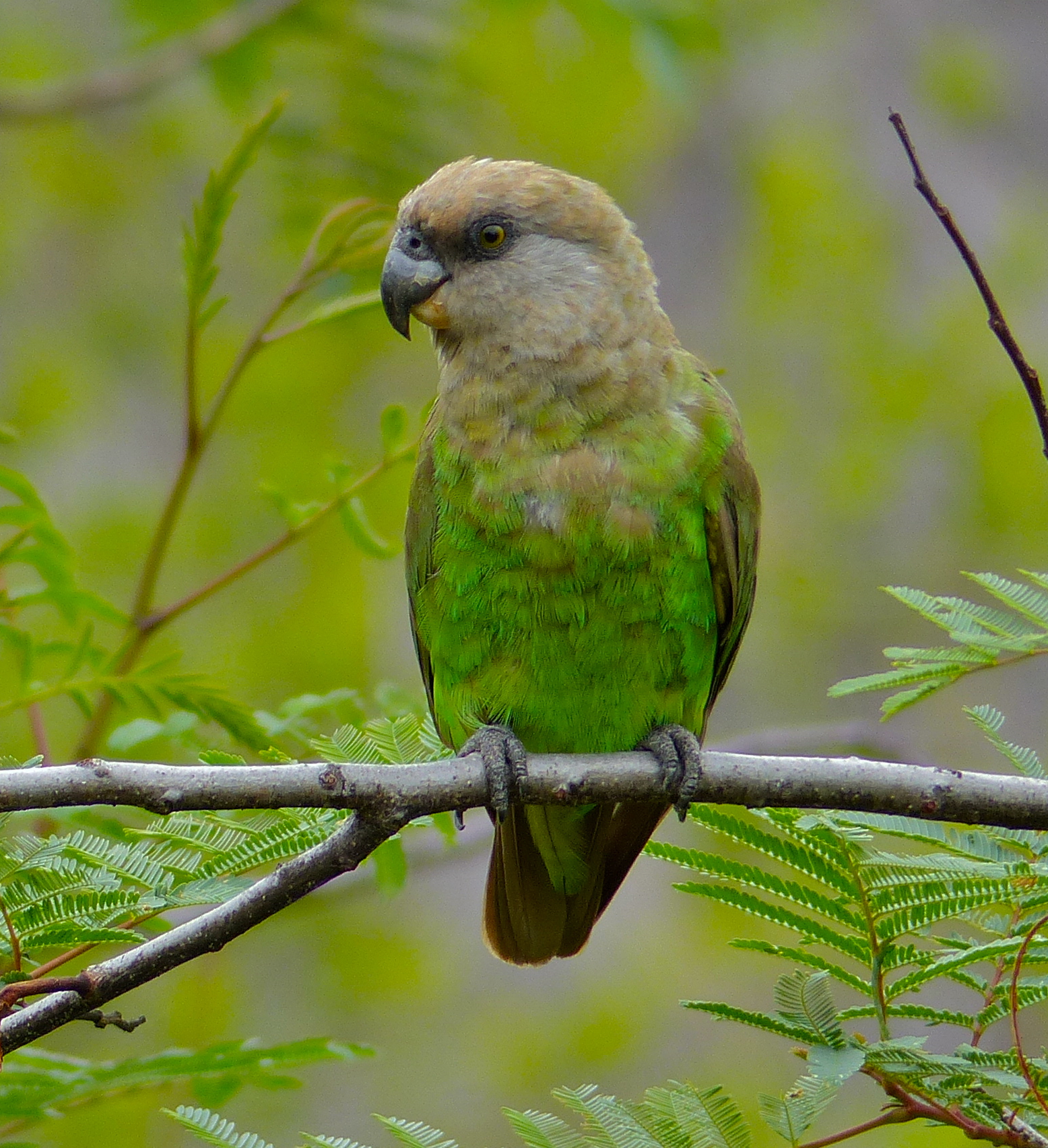
- In Kruger National Park, South Africa

Conservation status
- Least Concern (IUCN 3.1)

Scientific classification
- Kingdom: Animalia
- Phylum: Chordata
- Class: Aves
- Order: Psittaciformes
- Family: Psittacidae
- Genus: Poicephalus
- Species: P. cryptoxanthus

Binomial name
- Poicephalus cryptoxanthus (Peters, 1854)

= Brown-headed parrot =

Species of bird

The brown-headed parrot (Poicephalus cryptoxanthus) is a south-eastern African parrot.

== Description ==
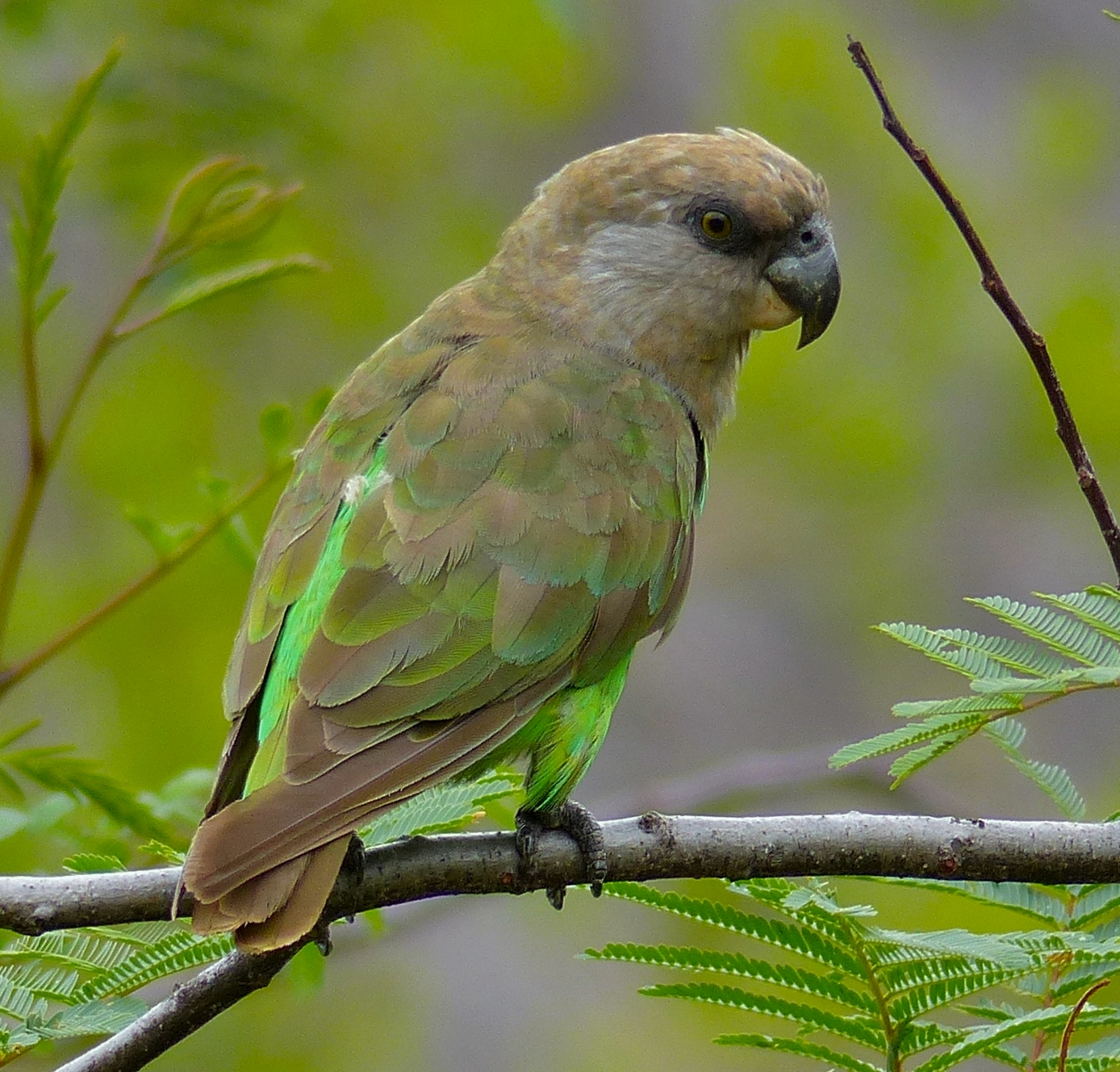
View of upperpart plumage

The general plumage colour is green, indeed Sinclair et al., (1993) describe the species as "the greenest parrot of the sub-region". The under wing coverts are bright yellow, although the extent of this is variable. It is from this yellow that the specific name derives, kryptos being Greek for hidden or concealed and xanthos meaning yellow.

The rump is very bright, almost metallic green. As is the margins of the feathers on the underparts, with this coloration becoming more pronounced towards the vent and thighs. The neck is grey-brown merging to brown on the head but merging to greenish on the mantle. On some individuals, some random yellow feathers are visible on the head, neck and wings. Why these occur is unknown but it has been proposed that these may result from over-vigorous preening by parents.

The tail is edged olive-brown and tipped green. The iris is greenish yellow (Maclean 1993) or yellow (Forshaw 1989) and the legs and feet are blackish grey. The bill is dark, almost black above, merging to whitish below. The immature is always described as "duller than the adult and yellowish below" (for example, Maclean 1993). The flight is described as "fast and direct" (Forshaw 1989).

== Taxonomy ==
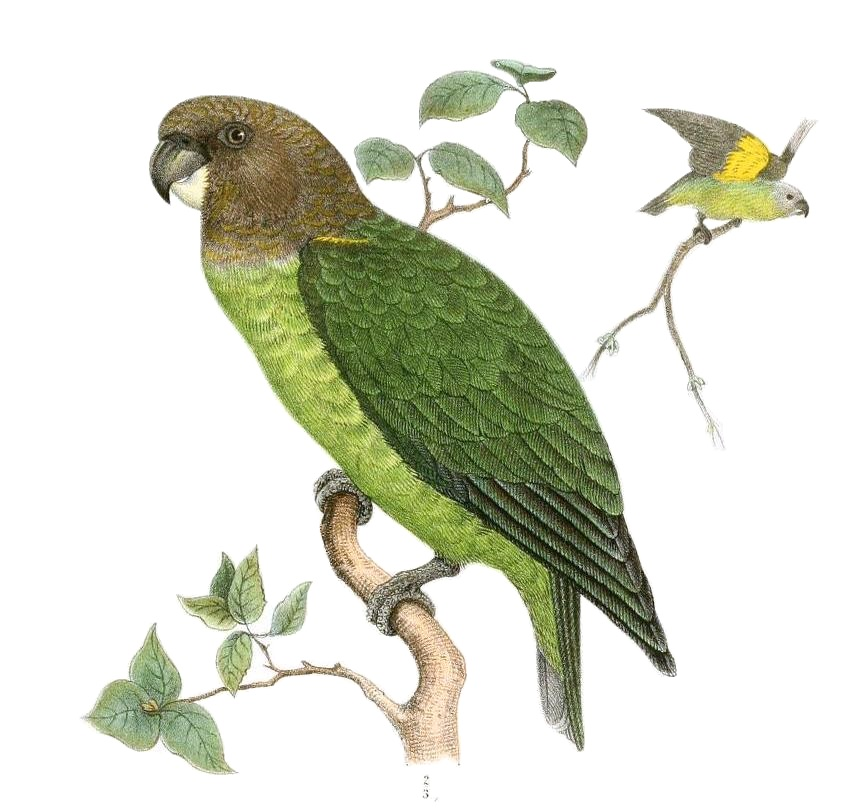
The concealed yellow wing lining in an illustration by Otto Finsch, 1870

Three subspecies have been recognised in the past, based on colouration and size (Forshaw 1989).

- P. cryptoxanthus cryptoxanthus ranges from Northern KwaZulu-Natal northwards to southern Mozambique and southeastern Zimbabwe.
- P. cryptoxanthus tanganyikae is distinguished in having a much paler and more greenish plumage with less brown on the head, throat, neck and rump. The underparts appear to be brighter and more yellowish. It occurs north of the Save River in Mozambique, southern Malawi, eastern Tanzania and coastal Kenya.
- P. cryptoxanthus zanzibaricus. The existence of this putative third subspecies, confined to the islands of Zanzibar and Pemba, is now doubted. Clancey (1977) found no difference in size between the modern birds of Zanzibar and those from the mainland. He concluded that if the subspecies existed then it is now extinct, either because of the direct intervention of man trapping the birds or by interbreeding with immigrant P. c. tanganyikae from the mainland. Similarly, whilst Forshaw (1989) reports morphological measurements for P.c. zanzibaricus, he also concludes that the existence of the subspecies is highly dubious.

== Aviculture ==
The brown-headed parrot are popular in aviculture. They have a very sweet temperament and tend to be a quieter bird. All parrots make some noise, but they tend to be quiet enough to make a good apartment bird.

== Diet ==
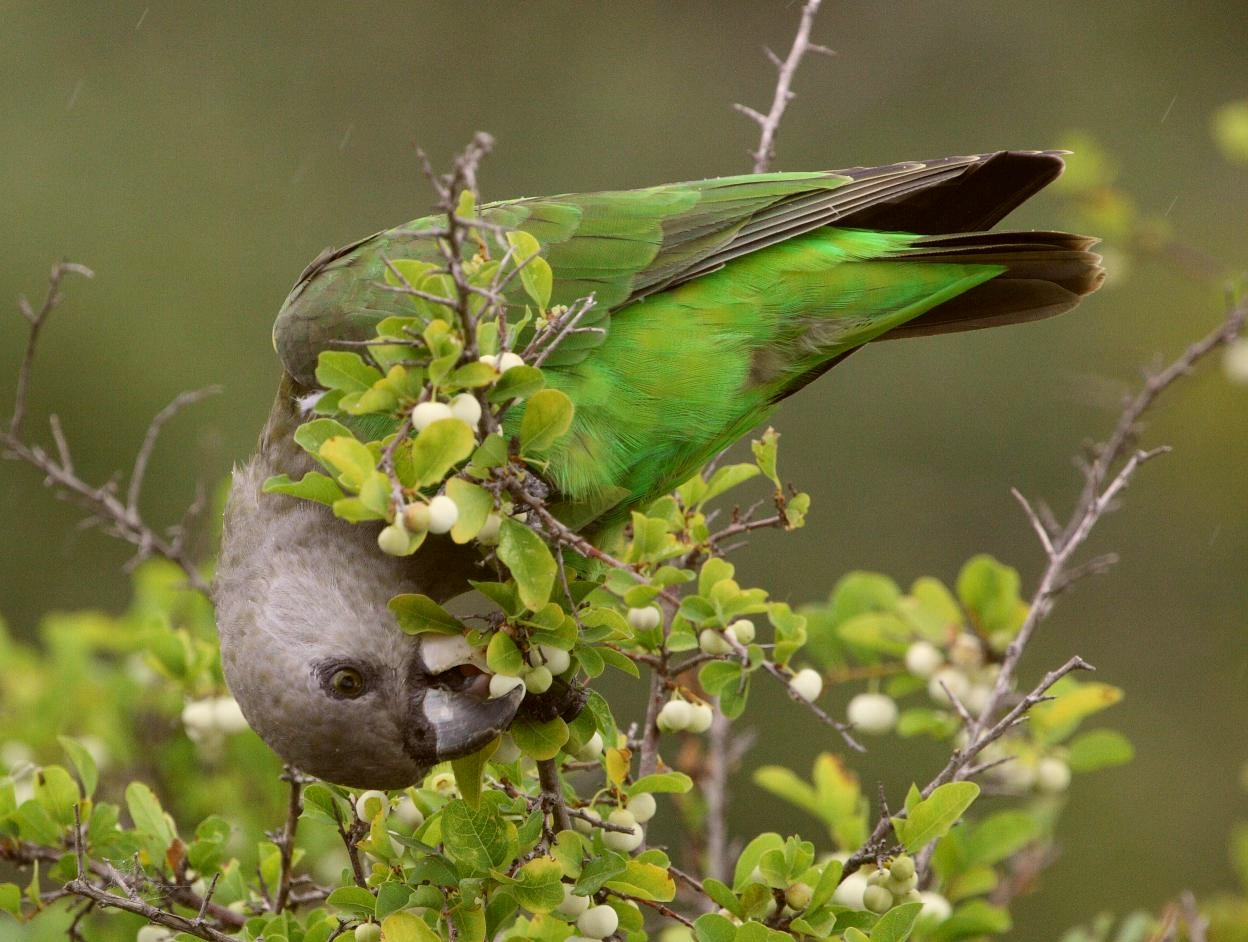
Eating fruit of Flueggea virosa

In terms of their diets, they are seen as opportunistic generalists as a result of their natural diet changing dependent on a food source being available or unavailable in their present environment. Typically, they feed on berries, figs, shoots, flowers, fruit, and seeds but more specifically, they tend to prefer the flowers and fruit of the Natal Mahogany tree (Trichilia emetica), Acacia spp. and lepidopteran larvae.
