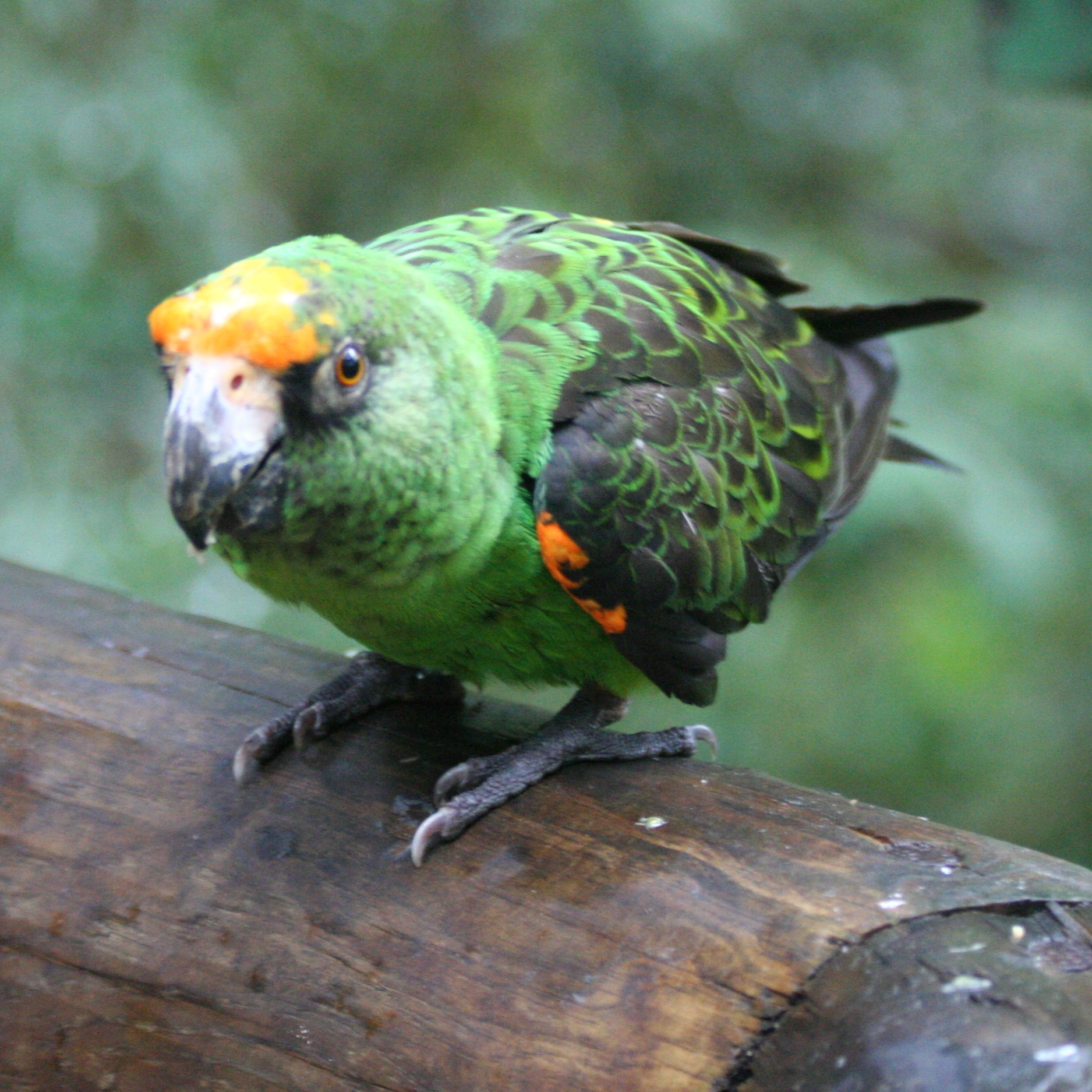
- P. g. fantiensis at Birds of Eden, South Africa

Conservation status
- Least Concern (IUCN 3.1)

Scientific classification
- Kingdom: Animalia
- Phylum: Chordata
- Class: Aves
- Order: Psittaciformes
- Family: Psittacidae
- Genus: Poicephalus
- Species: P. gulielmi

Binomial name
- Poicephalus gulielmi (Jardine, 1849)

Subspecies
- P. g. gulielmi, (Jardine 1849); P. g. fantiensis, Neumann 1908; P. g. massaicus, Fischer & Reichenow 1884
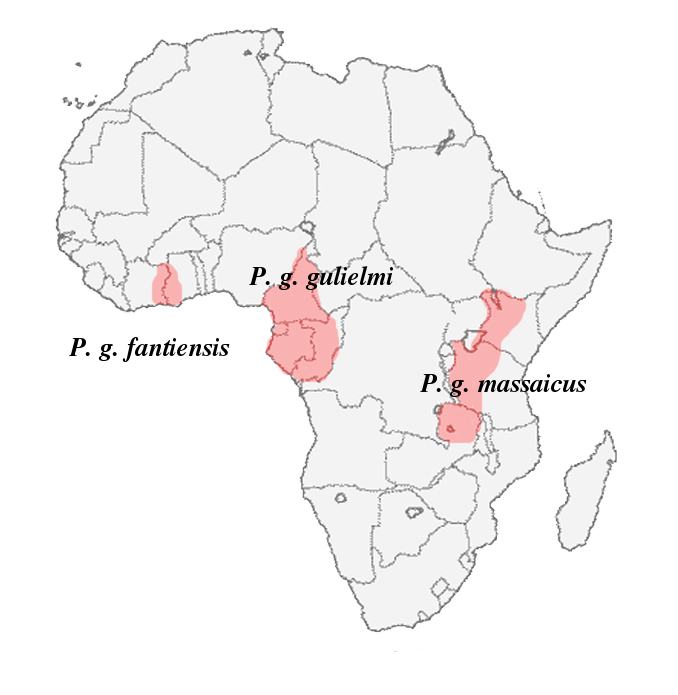
- Approximate ranges of subspecies

= Red-fronted parrot =

Species of bird

The red-fronted parrot (Poicephalus gulielmi), also known as Jardine's parrot, is a medium-sized mainly green parrot distributed across wide areas of Africa. It has three subspecies. The extent and shade of the red or orange plumage on its head, thighs, and bend of wings vary depending on the subspecies.

They are popular as pets, partly because of their ability to mimic speech and copy sounds. Trapping of wild birds for the pet trade is a potential threat to wild populations; however, they are protected by CITES (appendix II) making the trade, import and export of all wild-caught parrots illegal.

== Description ==
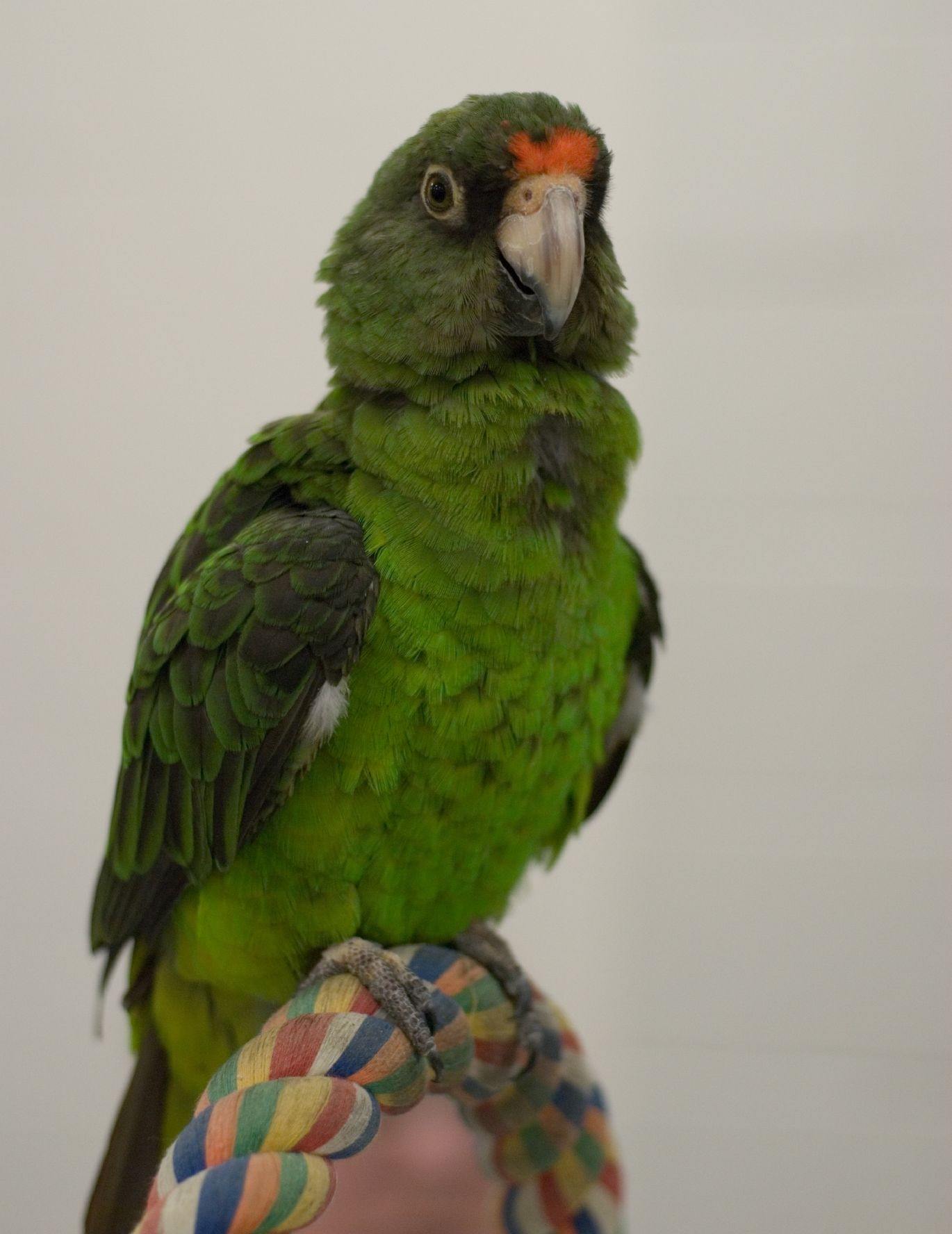
Juvenile with a little orange patch starting to form on its forehead

The red-fronted parrot is 28 cm (11 in) long. It is mostly green and has a short black squarish tail. Black feathers on the head, neck, back, and wings have lighter green edges giving a scalloped appearance. The lower mandible is dark grey and the upper mandible has a horn coloured base and a dark grey tip. The irises are red-orange, the eyerings are pinkish-grey, and the legs are grey-brown. The amount of red or orange on the forecrown, the bend of the wing, and thighs varies in the three subspecies but is absent in all young birds – juveniles having a dark smokey appearance above a paler beak and brown irises. The adult male and female are identical in external appearance. Sex determination of chicks is normally carried out by breeders using DNA analysis of a feather sample or by internal examination of the cloaca. The latter method is cheaper and quicker but does cause some distress to the bird.

== Taxonomy ==
The first red-fronted parrot to be scientifically identified was named Congo Jack. The parrot was brought back live from the Congo to the United Kingdom by Sir William Jardine's son on his return from a three-year cruise on HMS Favourite. Congo Jack became tame and whistled and screamed, rather than talk. Sir William Jardine gave the species the binomial name Pionus Gulielmi after his son, William R.N. (Latin: Gulielmi means "William's"), and published the description in 1849.

Three subspecies are now recognized:

- Poicephalus gulielmi, (Jardine 1849)
  - P. g. gulielmi, (Jardine 1849) – orange-red on forehead to forecrown, wings, and thighs. Endemic to the Congo River basin. This subspecies has also been introduced to the island of Puerto Rico.
  - P. g. fantiensis, Neumann 1908 – the forecrown is orange and there is an orange-red or orange on the wings, slightly smaller. Distributed from Liberia to southern Ghana.
  - P. g. massaicus, Fischer & Reichenow 1884 – similar to P. gulielmi except on the head the orange-red is less extensive occurring on the forehead above the beak. Endemic to the highlands (1800 to 3500m) of southern Kenya and northern Tanzania.

== Behaviour ==
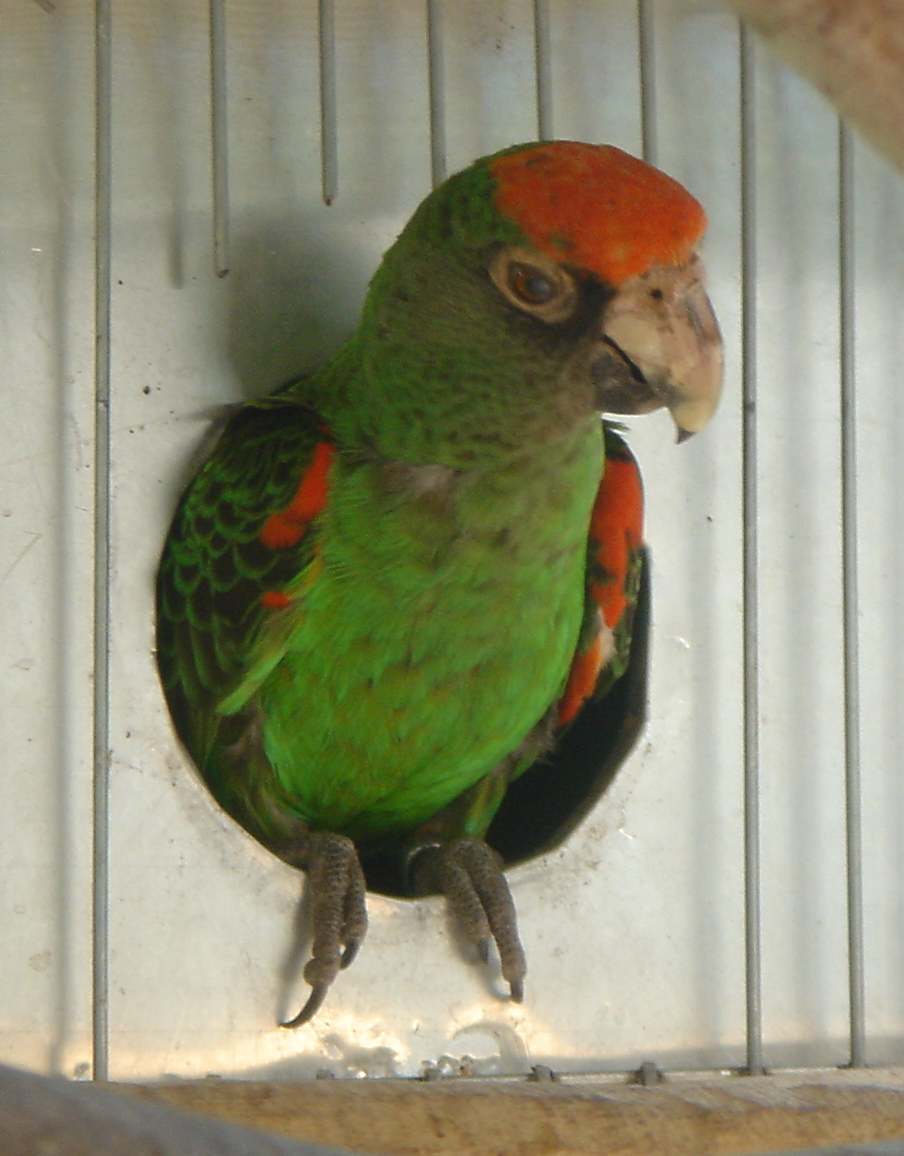
P. g. gulielmi, adult leaving the nest box

=== Breeding ===
The red-fronted parrot nests in tree cavities. The eggs are white and there are usually three or four in a clutch. The female incubates the eggs for about 27 days and the chicks leave the nest about 80 days after hatching.

=== Feeding ===
They fly swiftly making noisy calls above the forest in pairs or small groups between their night-time roosts and feeding grounds. They feed quietly in the upper canopy of trees, where they are well camouflaged.

== Pets ==
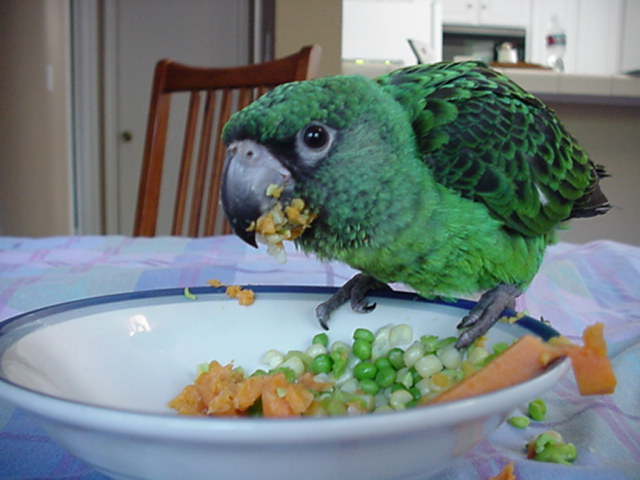
Fledgling pet eating vegetables

Usually called Jardine's parrots, the red-fronted parrot is becoming an increasingly popular pet, owing to increased availability and a growing following. They are particularly playful, intelligent, and affectionate. Some speak very clearly, and imitate other birds expertly. Their size, temperament, and voice makes them good candidates for apartment dwellers, though they can give a shrill call. Captive bred birds have an endearing nature, bonding well, usually imperceptibly or only slightly favouring one member of the family more than others. They are not as "needy" as some companion species and so long as they are occupied, can be left alone for longer periods without emotional stress (allowing the owners to work for example).

== Conservation status ==
The wild red-fronted parrot population in Africa is difficult to estimate, because of its vast range. They are potentially threatened by trapping of wild parrots for the pet trade; They are listed on appendix II of The Convention on the International Trade in Endangered Species (CITES), along with almost all other parrot species. This has made the trade, import and export of all wild caught parrots illegal.

== Cited texts ==
- Forshaw, Joseph M. (2006). Parrots of the World; an Identification Guide. Illustrated by Frank Knight. Princeton University Press. ISBN 0-691-09251-6.
