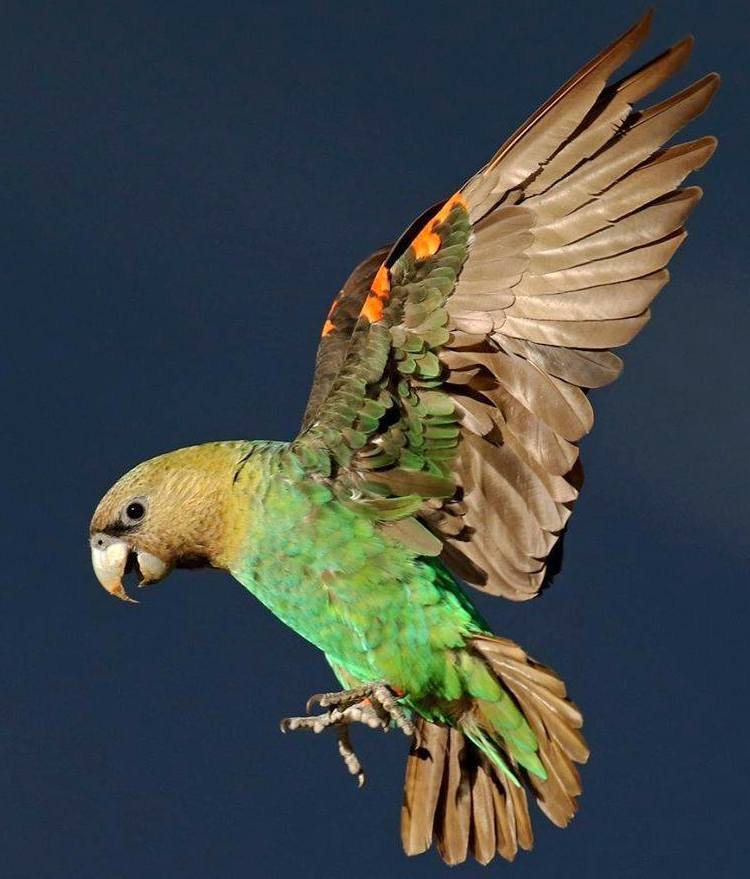
- Near East London, Eastern Cape

Conservation status
- Vulnerable (IUCN 3.1)

Scientific classification
- Kingdom: Animalia
- Phylum: Chordata
- Class: Aves
- Order: Psittaciformes
- Family: Psittacidae
- Genus: Poicephalus
- Species: P. robustus

Binomial name
- Poicephalus robustus (Gmelin, JF, 1788)
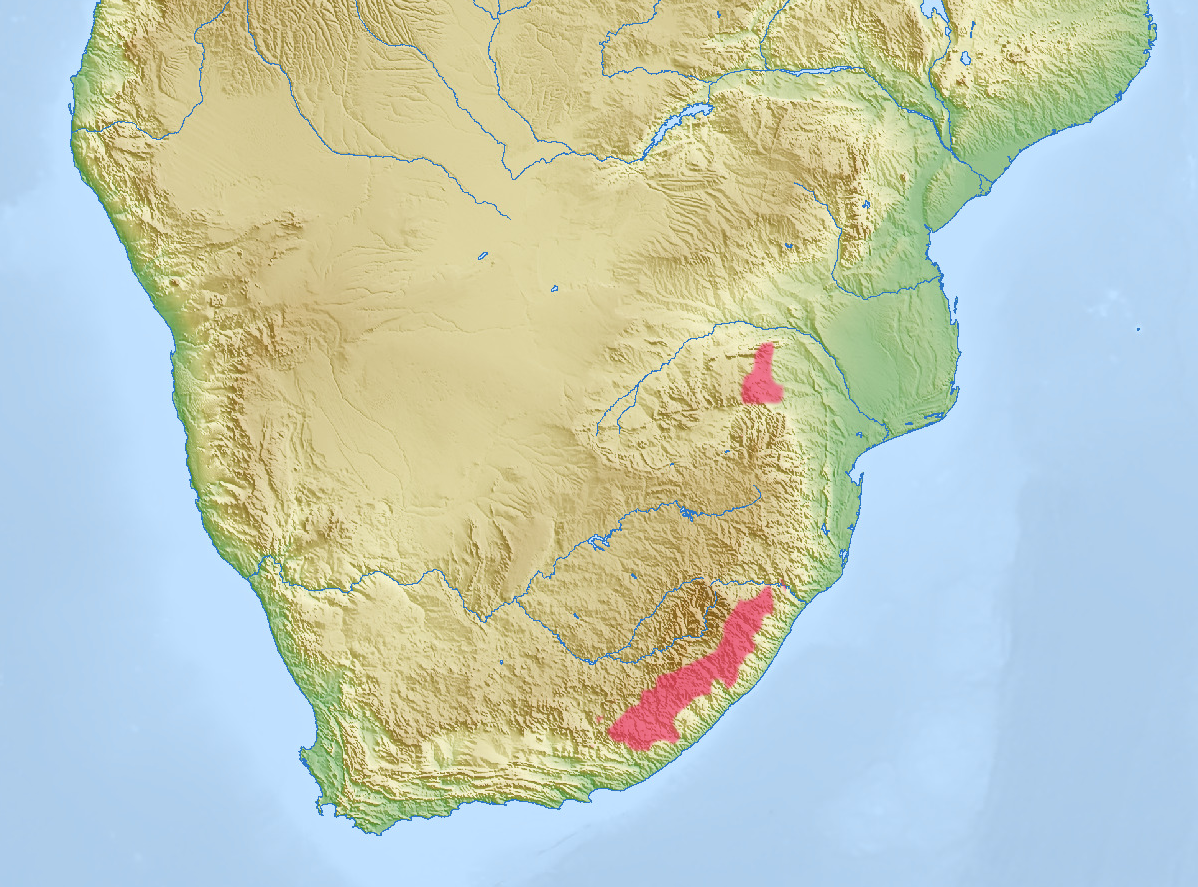
- P. robustus range

= Cape parrot =

Species of bird

The Cape parrot (Poicephalus robustus) or Levaillant's parrot is a large, temperate forest dwelling parrot of the genus Poicephalus endemic to South Africa. It was formerly grouped as a subspecies along with the savanna-dwelling brown-necked parrot (Poicephalus fuscicollis) and grey-headed parrot (P. f. suahelicus), but is now considered a distinct species.

== Taxonomy ==
The Cape parrot was described in 1781 by the English ornithologist John Latham under the English name, the "robust parrot". When in 1788 the German naturalist Johann Friedrich Gmelin revised and expanded Carl Linnaeus's Systema Naturae, he included the Cape parrot with a short description, coined the binomial name Psittacus robustus and cited Latham's work. The type locality is South Africa. The Cape parrot is now placed with nine other species in the genus Poicephalus that was introduced by the English naturalist William Swainson in 1837. The genus name is from the Ancient Greek phaios "grey" and -kephalos "headed". The specific epithet rubustus is Latin for "strong" or "robust". The species is monotypic: no subspecies are recognised.

The Cape parrot was formerly considered to be one of the three subspecies of the brown-necked parrot (Poicephalus fuscicollis). The Cape parrot is smaller than the other two taxa and has an olive-yellow rather than a silvery-grey head. A detailed genetic analysis of the three taxa published in 2015 confirmed the distinctness of brown-necked and cape parrots, and suggested that ancestors of the two had diverged between 2.13 and 2.67 million years ago in the late Pliocene to early Pleistocene epoch. This period was a period of changes in climate, where grassland and forest were expanding and contracting, which presumably led to isolation and eventually speciation of separate populations.

== Description ==
The Cape parrot is a short-tailed moderately large bird with a very large beak used to crack all sorts of hard nuts and fruit kernels, especially those of African yellowwood trees (Podocarpus spp.). This contrasts with the closely related savanna species (Poicephalus fuscicollis) which feeds on a wide variety of tropical woodland trees such as marula, Commiphora spp. and Terminalia spp. These species are sexually dimorphic, with females typically sporting an orange frontal patch on the forehead. Juveniles also show a larger orange - pink patch on the forehead but lack the red on shoulders and legs of adults. These plumage characteristics vary among individuals and among the three recognized forms.

== Distribution and habitat ==
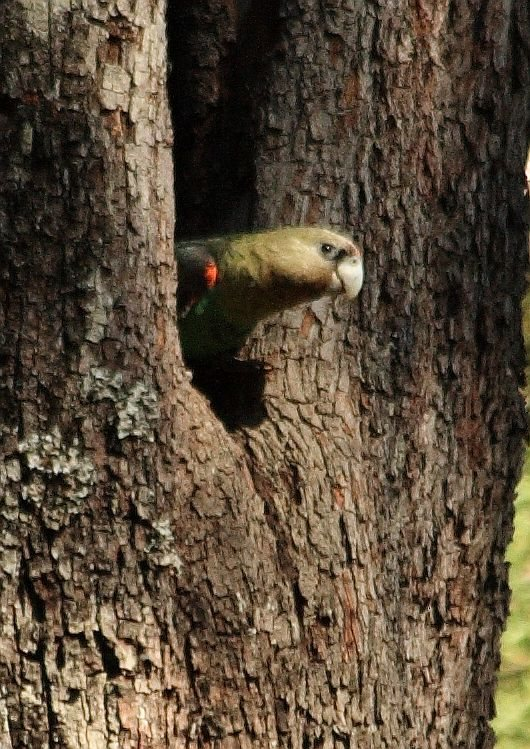
At Benvie, Karkloof, KwaZulu-Natal, South Africa

The Cape parrot is endemic to South Africa. It occurs in Afromontane forests at moderate altitudes in eastern South Africa from the coastal escarpment near sea-level to the midlands at around 1000m. These forests occur as a series of small patches around the south and east of South Africa and are dominated by yellowwood trees (Podocarpus latifolius, Podocarpus falcatus and Podocarpus henkelii). Cape parrots have a disjunct distribution with the largest population around in the Amathole mountains of the Eastern Cape Province and extending east, with several large gaps, through the Mthatha escarpment and Pondoland in the Eastern Cape and the southern midlands of KwaZulu-Natal Province to Karkloof, near Pietermaritzburg. A very small population, of around 30 individuals occurs over 600 km to the north in the Magoebaskloof area of Limpopo Province. Cape parrots are absent from large areas of afromontane forests such as those along the southern coast of South Africa, near Knysna, the higher altitude Afromontane forests in the Drakensberg mountains of KwaZulu-Natal, or the moderate-altitude forests of northern KwaZulu-Natal province and Eswatini, which separate the KwaZulu-Natal midlands and Limpopo escarpment populations. All of these areas are within the dispersal range of the parrots and there are old records of Cape parrots from northern KwaZulu-Natal.

== Aviculture ==
Over one hundred P. robustus parrots are kept as cage birds, most of which are wild-caught birds although they do breed reasonably well in captivity. To date there have not been any successful releases of captive birds and the survival of this species is dependent on habitat conservation to maintain wild populations. Trade and export of wild-caught Cape parrots from South Africa has been made illegal by the international CITES agreement (appendix list II) and by South African law. They are regarded for their intelligence. A small trade still persists in the related Grey-headed and brown-necked parrots.

== Conservation status ==
The IUCN Red List, which uses the Birdlife International checklist, formerly lumped the common and widespread grey-headed parrot with Cape parrots and brown-necked parrots, each of which are more narrowly distributed and more threatened, leading to an assessment of least concern. This contrasts with alternative assessments of the South African endemic P. robustus, as threatened and possible threatened status of the brown-headed parrot of West Africa.

Hundreds of volunteers participate on the first weekend each May in the "Cape Parrot Big Birding Day" which is an annual count of the population throughout its distribution. The parrots are relatively easy to count at any forest patch due to their distinctive silhouettes, slow, 'rowing' flight and raucous calls. Counts are made in the evening as parrots arrive at roost patches and in the following morning as the parrots leave. A complete census of the population is difficult to achieve, however, as these forests are naturally fragmented and there are insufficient volunteers to count the more remote patches. There are also difficulties in achieving a precise count because the birds fly long distances for food and may be 'double-counted' at both feeding and roosting sites. Counts increased from about 500 specimens in May 2000 to over 1000 in recent years, although this may be largely explained by an increase in the particular sites that were counted. The parrots are particularly threatened by the fatal Psittacine beak and feather disease virus (BFDV), and there have been suggestions that a diet heavy in yellowwood fruits greatly reduces the symptoms, although this has not been empirically investigated. Their habitat is being reduced by logging and modification of African yellowwood trees, in particular the loss of old trees and dead snags with suitable nesting hollows. The provision of nesting boxes has had some success and offers some hope for increasing the proportion of breeding individuals.
