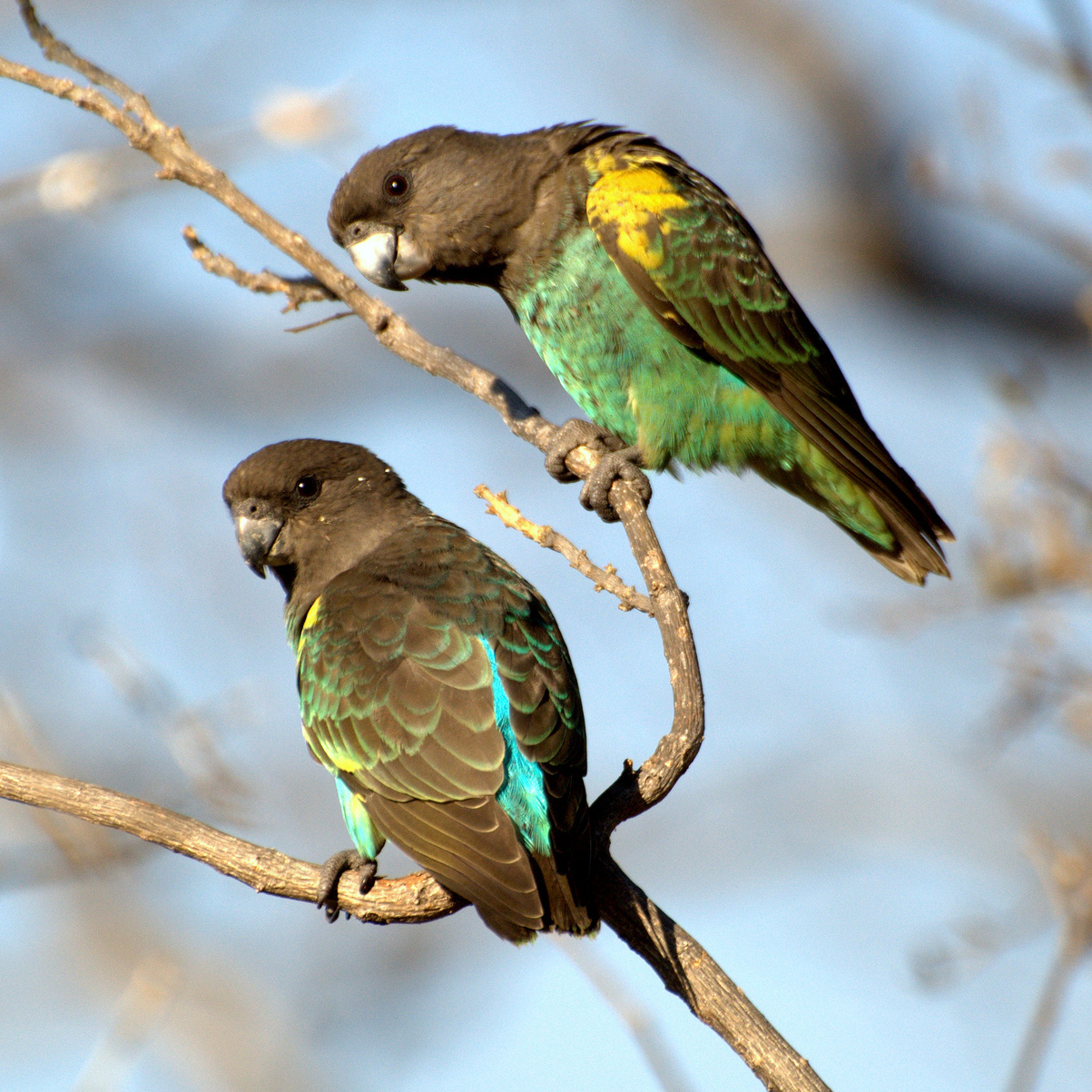
- P. m. transvaalensis pair in Zimbabwe

Conservation status
- Least Concern (IUCN 3.1)

Scientific classification
- Kingdom: Animalia
- Phylum: Chordata
- Class: Aves
- Order: Psittaciformes
- Family: Psittacidae
- Genus: Poicephalus
- Species: P. meyeri

Binomial name
- Poicephalus meyeri (Cretzschmar, 1827)
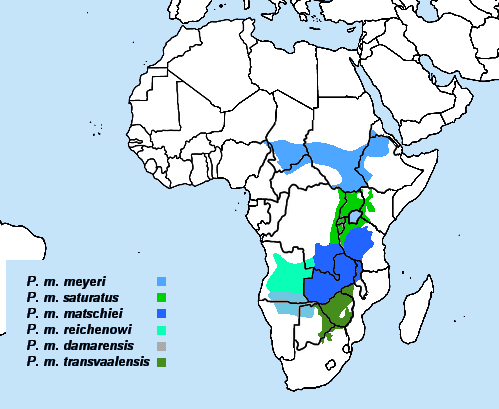
- range and subspecies

= Meyer's parrot =

Species of bird

Meyer's parrot (Poicephalus meyeri), also known as the brown parrot, is a species of parrot native to Africa. A Meyer's parrot has black feathers, turquoise belly, blue rump, and bright yellow markings on the carpal joint of the wings. Most subspecies have some yellow on the top of the head as well. Forshaw (1989) recognizes six subspecies of P. meyeri which vary in home range, size and in markings, including the extent of yellow markings to the head and wings, and the intensity of turquoise markings on the belly and rump.

== Taxonomy ==
German physician and ornithologist Philipp Jakob Cretzschmar described Meyer's parrot in 1827. The name commemorates the German ornithologist Bernhard Meyer.

The six subspecies are:

- P. m. meyeri (Cretzschmar, 1827) — s Chad to w Ethiopia
- P. m. saturatus (Sharpe, 1901) — Uganda and w Kenya to w Tanzania
- P. m. matschiei (Neumann, 1898) — c Tanzania, se Congo, Zambia and n Malawi
- P. m. reichenowi (Neumann, 1898) — c Angola to s Congo
- P. m. damarensis (Neumann, 1898) — n Namibia, s Angola and nw Botswana
- P. m. transvaalensis (Neumann, 1899) — Botswana, Zimbabwe and n South Africa

Subspecies P. m. damarensis and P. m. reichenowi lack yellow markings on the head, while P. m. transvaalensis may have little to no yellow on the head. Belly and rump colours vary according to subspecies from turquoise to blue.

== Distribution and habitat ==
Meyer's parrots are native to the plateau woodlands of sub-Saharan Africa where they occur in several woodland types including miombo, savanna woodlands, wooded grasslands and forests bordering watercourses or agricultural land. They are found in high densities in the Okavango Delta region of Botswana. They are also found in southern and central Africa (Chad, Sudan, South Sudan, Ethiopia, Congo, Angola, Tanzania, Zambia, Zimbabwe, Mozambique, and Namibia.

== Behaviour ==
=== Food and feeding ===
Their wild diet includes fruit, seeds, nuts, berries and cultivated crops. Seeds of the various leguminous trees of the African woodlands are especially favoured, providing their staple food in some areas. Although they normally travel in pairs or small flocks, wild Meyer's parrots may gather in much larger numbers where food is plentiful. In drought years they wander in search of food.

=== Breeding ===
The Meyer's parrot nests in tree cavities. The eggs are white and there are usually three or four in a clutch. The female incubates the eggs for about 28 days and the chicks leave the nest about 60 days after hatching.

== Conservation status ==
Meyer's parrots are still common in the wild, although numbers have decreased locally following destruction of woodlands. It is generally not considered to be at risk, as their large population, limited pressure from trade and hunting, and 6,000,000 km^{2} home range make these birds unlikely to face extinction in the near future. Trade in Meyer's parrots that have been bred in aviculture is legal. Meyer's parrots are listed on Appendix II of the Convention on International Trade in Endangered Species of Wild Flora and Fauna. Appendix II listing means the species can also be taken from the wild and traded in 'limited' numbers.

== In aviculture ==
Meyer's parrots are commonly bred for the pet trade. They are relatively quiet and small and are able to learn dozens of words.

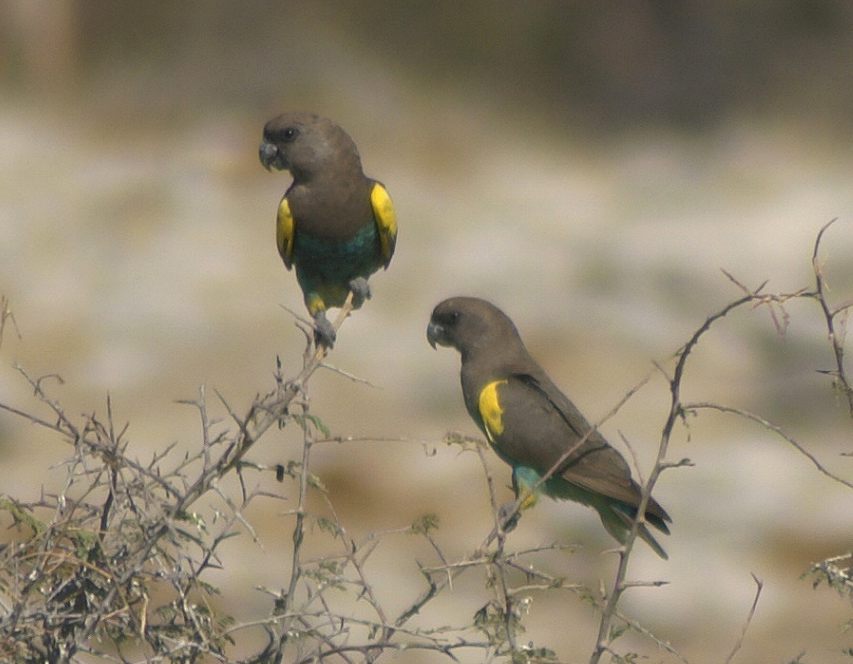
P. m. damarensis pair at Etosha, Namibia

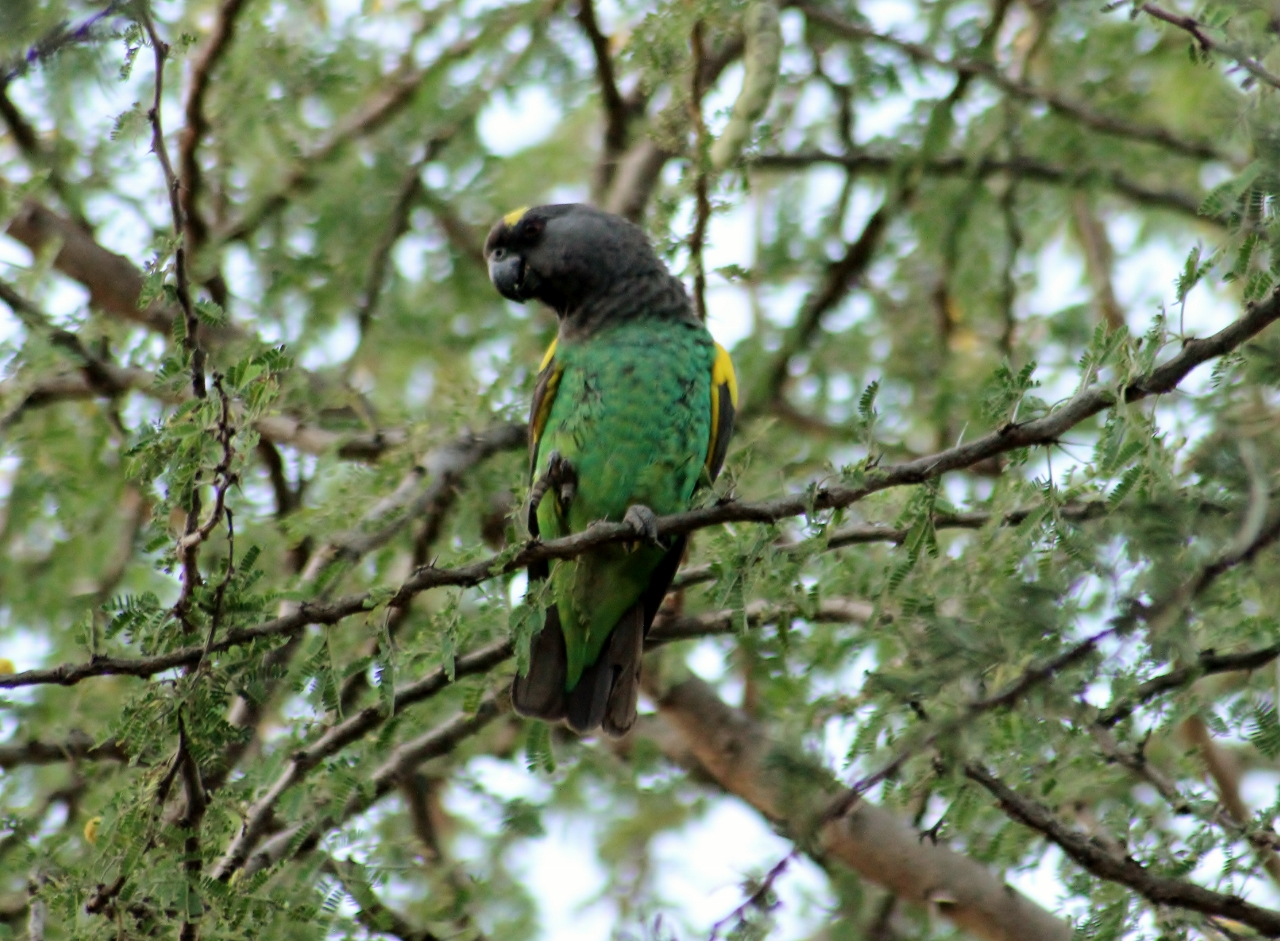
P. m. saturatus in the Serengeti, Tanzania

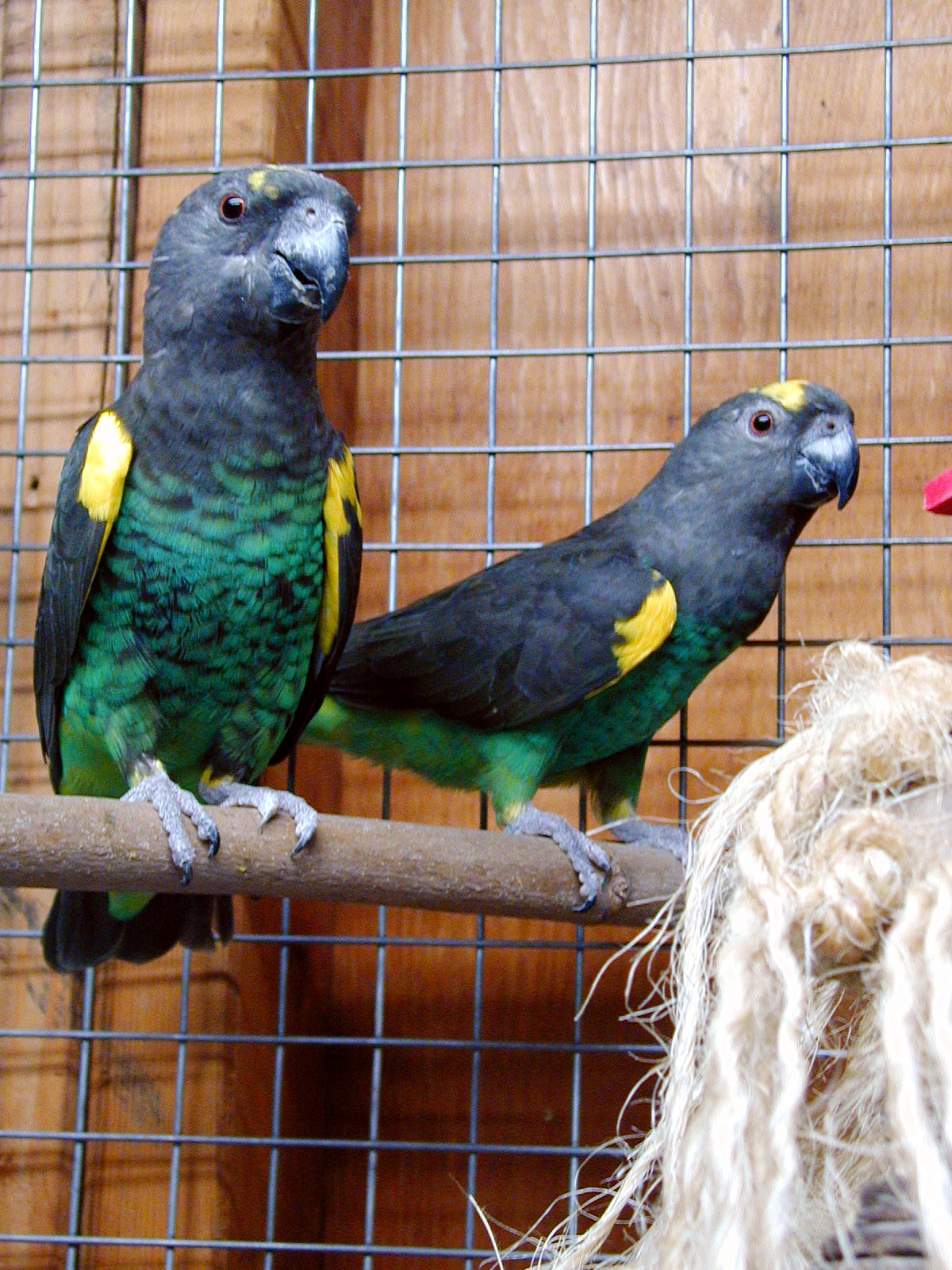
Captive pair

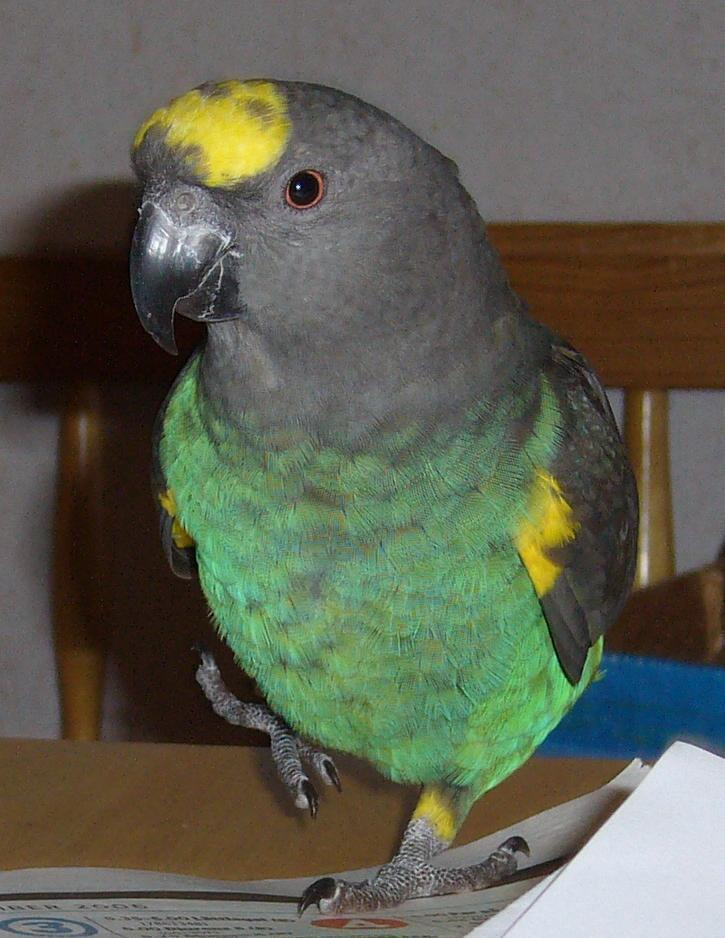
A three-year-old pet
