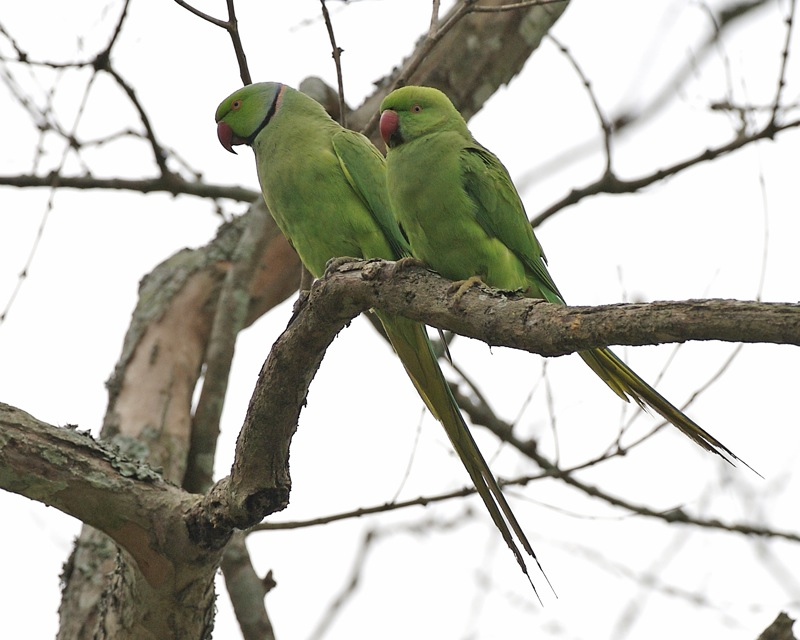
- Psittacula krameri

Scientific classification
- Domain: Eukaryota
- Kingdom: Animalia
- Phylum: Chordata
- Class: Aves
- Order: Psittaciformes
- Family: Psittaculidae
- Subfamily: Psittaculinae; Vigors, 1825

Tribes
- Micropsittini; Polytelini; Psittaculini

= Psittaculinae =

Subfamily of birds

The parrot subfamily Psittaculinae consists of three tribes: the Polytelini with three genera, the Psittaculini or Asian psittacines, and the pygmy parrots of the Micropsittini tribe.

== Genera ==
Tribe Micropsittini:

- Genus Micropsitta
  - Buff-faced pygmy parrot, Micropsitta pusio
  - Yellow-capped pygmy parrot, Micropsitta keiensis
  - Geelvink pygmy parrot, Micropsitta geelvinkiana
  - Meek's pygmy parrot, Micropsitta meeki
  - Finsch's pygmy parrot, Micropsitta finschii
  - Red-breasted pygmy parrot, Micropsitta bruijnii

Tribe Polytelini:

- Genus Alisterus
  - Australian king parrot, Alisterus scapularis
  - Moluccan king parrot, Alisterus amboinensis
  - Papuan king parrot, Alisterus chloropterus
- Genus Aprosmictus
  - Jonquil parrot, Aprosmictus jonquillaceus
  - Red-winged parrot, Aprosmictus erythropterus
- Genus Polytelis
  - Superb parrot, Polytelis swainsonii
  - Regent parrot, Polytelis anthopeplus
  - Princess parrot, Polytelis alexandrae

Tribe Psittaculini:

- Genus Psittinus
  - Blue-rumped parrot, Psittinus cyanurus
  - Simeulue parrot, Psittinus abbotti
- Genus Geoffroyus
  - Red-cheeked parrot, Geoffroyus geoffroyi
  - Blue-collared parrot, Geoffroyus simplex
  - Song parrot, Geoffroyus heteroclitus
  - Rennell parrot, Geoffroyus hyacinthinus
- Genus Prioniturus
  - Montane racket-tail, Prioniturus montanus
  - Mindanao racket-tail, Prioniturus waterstradti
  - Blue-headed racket-tail, Prioniturus platenae
  - Green racket-tail, Prioniturus luconensis
  - Blue-crowned racket-tail, Prioniturus discurus
  - Blue-winged racket-tail, Prioniturus verticalis (also known as Sulu Racquet-tail)
  - Yellow-breasted racket-tail, Prioniturus flavicans
  - Golden-mantled racket-tail, Prioniturus platurus
  - Buru racket-tail, Prioniturus mada
  - Mindoro racket-tail, Prioniturus mindorensis
- Genus Tanygnathus
  - Great-billed parrot, Tanygnathus megalorynchos
  - Blue-naped parrot, Tanygnathus lucionensis
  - Blue-backed parrot, Tanygnathus sumatranus
  - Black-lored parrot, Tanygnathus gramineus
- Genus Eclectus
  - Moluccan eclectus, Eclectus roratus
  - Sumba eclectus, Eclectus cornelia
  - Tanimbar eclectus, Eclectus riedeli
  - Papuan eclectus, Eclectus polychloros
  - † Oceanic eclectus, Eclectus infectus (extinct or prehistoric)
- Genus Psittacula
  - Alexandrine parakeet, Psittacula eupatria
  - † Seychelles parakeet, Psittacula wardi
  - Rose-ringed parakeet, Psittacula krameri
  - Echo parakeet, Psittacula eques
  - † Newton's parakeet, Psittacula exsul
  - Slaty-headed parakeet, Psittacula himalayana
  - Grey-headed parakeet, Psittacula finschii
  - Plum-headed parakeet, Psittacula cyanocephala
  - Blossom-headed parakeet, Psittacula roseata
  - Blue-winged parakeet, Psittacula columboides
  - Layard's parakeet, Psittacula calthrapae
  - Lord Derby's parakeet, Psittacula derbiana
  - Red-breasted parakeet, Psittacula alexandri
  - Nicobar parakeet, Psittacula caniceps
  - Long-tailed parakeet, Psittacula longicauda
  - † Mascarene grey parakeet, Psittacula bensoni
- † Genus Lophopsittacus
  - † Broad-billed parrot, Lophopsittacus mauritianus
- † Genus Necropsittacus
  - † Rodrigues parrot Necropsittacus rodricanus
- † Genus Mascarinus
  - † Mascarene parrot Mascarinus mascarinus

The subdivisions within the genus Psittacula are controversial, as recent genetic studies indicate that it is paraphyletic. Thus, suggestions have been made to either split the genus into 6 different genera or keep Psittacula as it is but include Tanygnathus, Psittinus, and Mascarinus within it.
