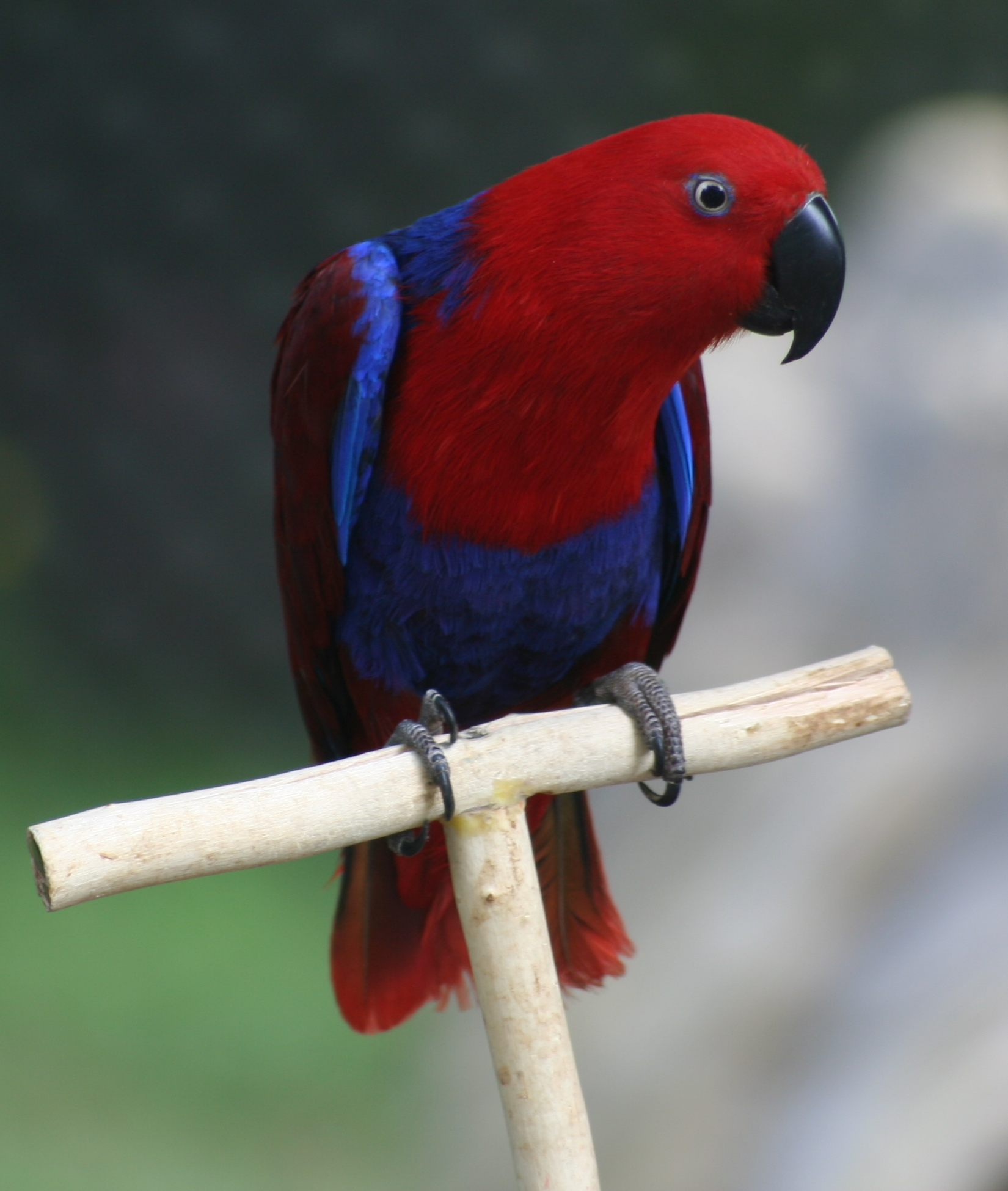
- Female eclectus parrot (Eclectus roratus)

Scientific classification
- Kingdom: Animalia
- Phylum: Chordata
- Class: Aves
- Order: Psittaciformes
- Family: Psittaculidae
- Subfamily: Psittaculinae
- Tribe: Psittaculini; Vigors, 1825

Genera
- Prioniturus; Eclectus; Geoffroyus; Tanygnathus; Psittinus; Psittacula

= Psittaculini =

Tribe of birds

Psittaculini is a tribe of parrots of the family Psittaculidae. The subdivisions within the tribe are controversial.

== Tribe Psittaculini ==
- Genus Psittinus
  - Blue-rumped parrot, Psittinus cyanurus
  - Simeulue parrot, Psittinus abbotti
- Genus Geoffroyus
  - Red-cheeked parrot, Geoffroyus geoffroyi
  - Blue-collared parrot, Geoffroyus simplex
  - Song parrot, Geoffroyus heteroclitus
  - Rennell parrot, Geoffroyus hyacinthinus
- Genus Prioniturus
  - Montane racket-tail, Prioniturus montanus
  - Mindanao racket-tail, Prioniturus waterstradti
  - Blue-headed racket-tail, Prioniturus platenae
  - Green racket-tail, Prioniturus luconensis
  - Blue-crowned racket-tail, Prioniturus discurus
  - Blue-winged racket-tail, Prioniturus verticalis (also known as Sulu Racquet-tail)
  - Yellow-breasted racket-tail, Prioniturus flavicans
  - Golden-mantled racket-tail, Prioniturus platurus
  - Buru racket-tail, Prioniturus mada
  - Mindoro racket-tail, Prioniturus mindorensis
- Genus Tanygnathus
  - Great-billed parrot, Tanygnathus megalorynchos
  - Blue-naped parrot, Tanygnathus lucionensis
  - Blue-backed parrot, Tanygnathus sumatranus
  - Black-lored parrot, Tanygnathus gramineus
- Genus Eclectus
  - Moluccan eclectus, Eclectus roratus
  - Sumba eclectus, Eclectus cornelia
  - Tanimbar eclectus, Eclectus riedeli
  - Papuan eclectus, Eclectus polychros
  - †Oceanic eclectus, Eclectus infectus (extinct)
- Genus Psittacula
  - Alexandrine parakeet, Psittacula eupatria
  - †Seychelles parakeet, Psittacula wardi (extinct)
  - Rose-ringed parakeet, Psittacula krameri
  - Echo parakeet, Psittacula eques
    - †Réunion parakeet, Psittacula eques eques (extinct)
  - †Newton's parakeet, Psittacula exsul (extinct)
  - Slaty-headed parakeet, Psittacula himalayana
  - Grey-headed parakeet, Psittacula finschii
  - Plum-headed parakeet, Psittacula cyanocephala
  - Blossom-headed parakeet, Psittacula roseata
  - Blue-winged parakeet, Psittacula columboides
  - Layard's parakeet, Psittacula calthropae
  - Lord Derby's parakeet, Psittacula derbiana
  - Red-breasted parakeet, Psittacula alexandri
  - Nicobar parakeet, Psittacula caniceps
  - Long-tailed parakeet, Psittacula longicauda
- Genus Lophopsittacus (extinct)
  - Mauritius grey parrot, Lophopsittacus (disputed) bensoni (extinct)
  - Broad-billed parrot, Lophopsittacus mauritianus (extinct)
- Genus Necropsittacus (extinct)
  - Rodrigues parrot Necropsittacus rodericanus (extinct)
