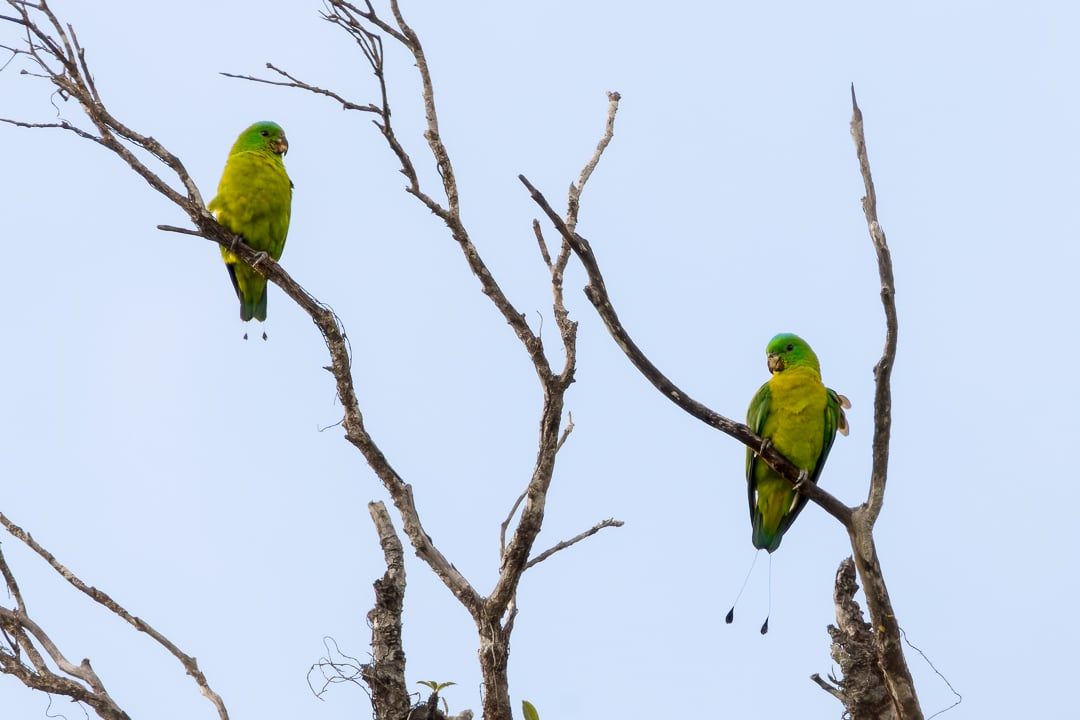
- A female (left) and male (right) ssp. whiteheadi

Conservation status
- Least Concern (IUCN 3.1)

Scientific classification
- Kingdom: Animalia
- Phylum: Chordata
- Class: Aves
- Order: Psittaciformes
- Family: Psittaculidae
- Genus: Prioniturus
- Species: P. discurus

Binomial name
- Prioniturus discurus (Vieillot, 1822)

= Blue-crowned racket-tail =

Species of bird

The blue-crowned racket-tail (Prioniturus discurus) is a species of parrot in the family Psittaculidae. It is endemic to the Philippines found in Luzon, Mindanao and Visayas where it is found in tropical moist lowland forest. The Mindoro racket-tail of Mindoro and Blue-headed racket-tail of Palawan were once considered subspecies of the Blue-crowned racket-tail but are now separate species. While not endangered, this species' population is on the decline due to habitat loss and the cagebird trade.

Under Philippine Law RA 9147, it is illegal to hunt, capture, or possess this species.

== Description and taxonomy ==
Formerly conspecific with, Mindoro racket-tail and Blue-headed racket-tail but was proven a distinct species by molecular studies and is differentiated by its call, amount and placement of blue on its head.

=== Subspecies ===
Two subspecies are recognized:

- P. d.discurus – Found on Mindanao (and proximate islands), Jolo and Basilan; lores, cheeks, throat and breast pale olive-grey
- P. d. whiteheadi– Found South Luzon and Catanduanes, Tablas, Sibuyan, Masbate, Ticao, Panay, Guimaras, Negros, Cebu, Bohol, Biliran, Samar and Leyte; has less extensive blue on crown

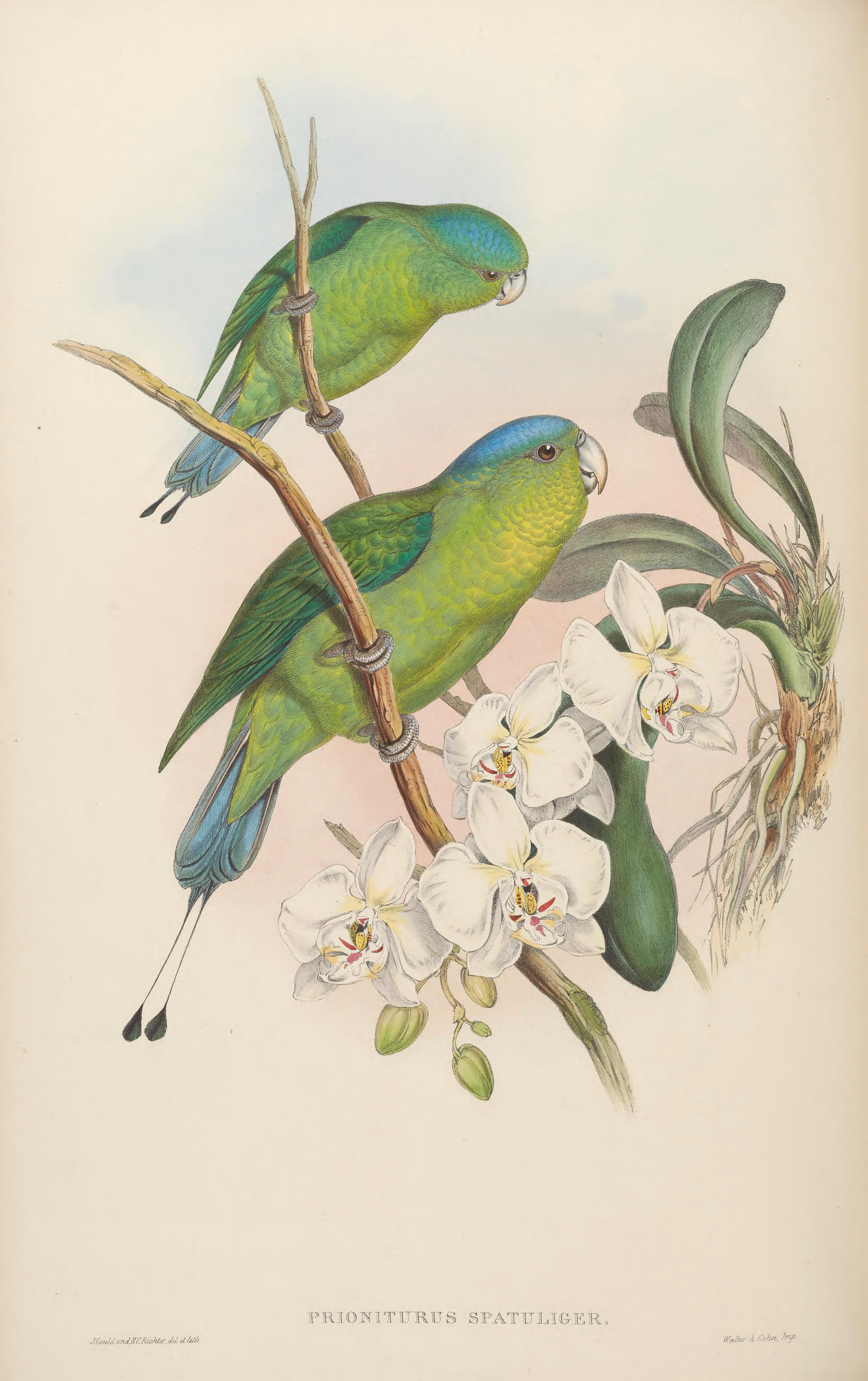
An illustration by John Gould

Races may represent two distinct species and further studies are needed to better understand its taxonomy especially the populations on Samar and Leyte which appears to be an intermediate form

== Ecology and behavior ==
Diet is poorly documented but known to feed on bananas and figs. Forms small flocks of up to 12 birds. Breeding occurs in August to September. They are cavity nesters, using old woodpecker nests, and make nesting colonies in tall live trees. Clutch is typically three eggs.

== Habitat and conservation status ==
This species habitat is primary and secondary forest up to 1,750 but mostly below 1,500 as it is replaced by Montane racket-tail and Mindanao racket-tail there after. Also visits mangroves, orchards and feeds on banana plantation.

IUCN has assessed this bird as least-concern species – making this the only racket-tail with this status. It appears to be much more tolerant to habitat loss and remains locally common. However, this species' population is said to be decreasing.Deforestation in the Philippines continues throughout the country due to slash and burn farming, mining, illegal logging and habitat conversion. This species is still trapped for the pet trade despite relatively low survivability of Racket-tails compared to other parrot species.

It is found in multiple protected areas such as Bicol Natural Park Pasonanca Natural Park, Rajah Sikatuna Protected Landscape, Northern Negros Natural Park, Samar Island Natural Park but like all areas in the Philippines, protection is lax and deforestation continues despite this protection on paper.

== Gallery ==
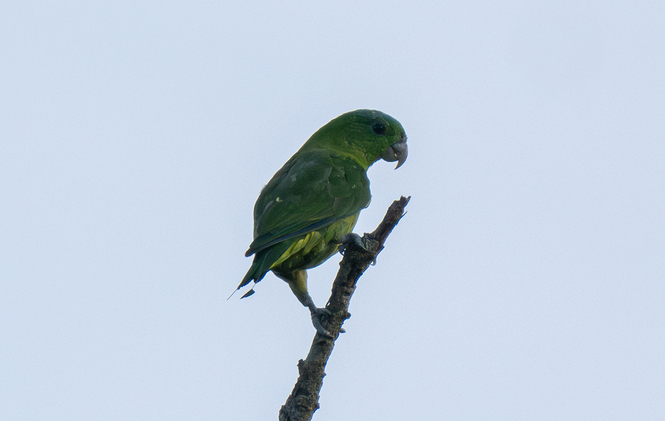
Photo of the whiteheadi subspecies which is likely is a female due to a shorter tail.

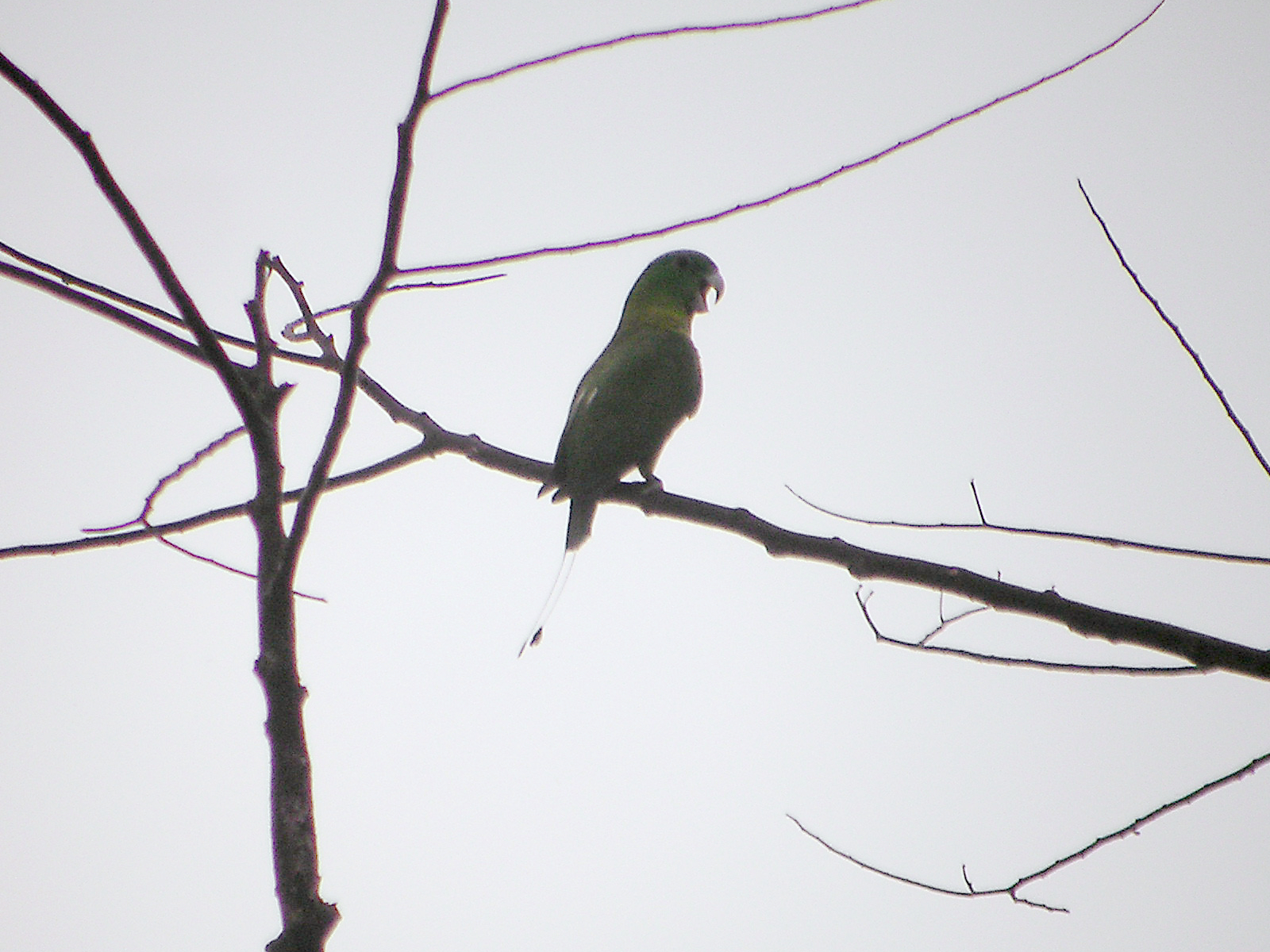
Photo of the discurus subspecies which is likely is a male due to a longer tail.

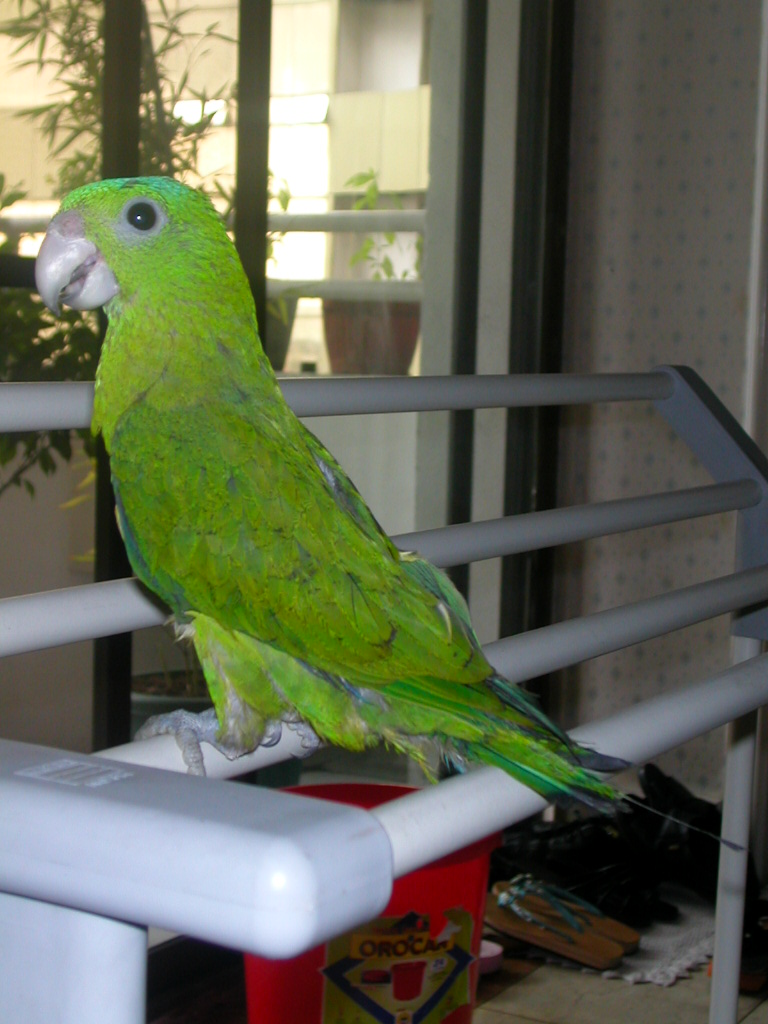
A juvenile captive Blue-crowned racquet tail, likely from the illegal wildlife trade.
