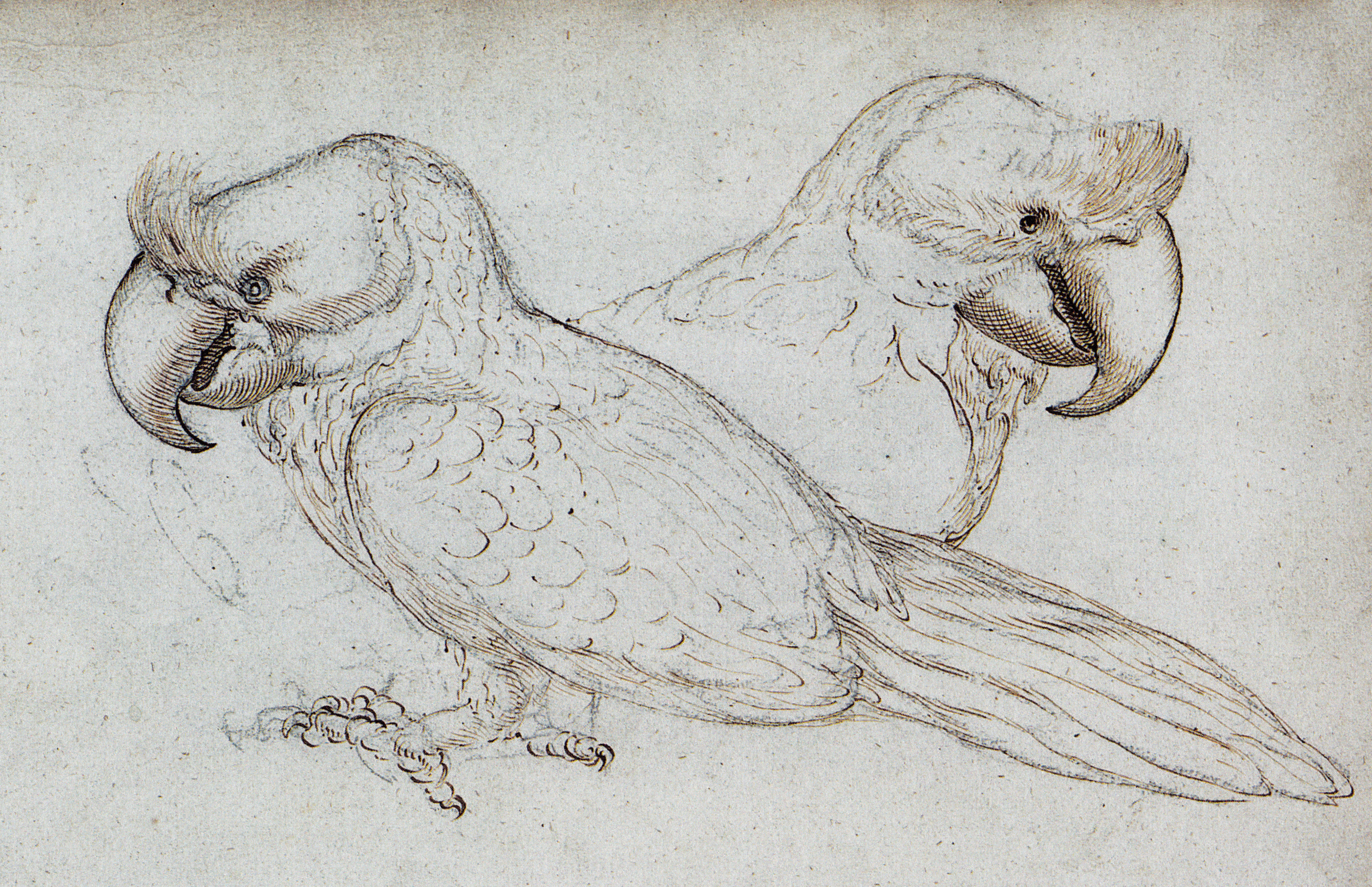
- Sketch of two individuals in the Gelderland ship's journal, 1601

Conservation status
- Extinct (c. 1680s?) (IUCN 3.1)

Scientific classification
- Kingdom: Animalia
- Phylum: Chordata
- Class: Aves
- Order: Psittaciformes
- Family: Psittaculidae
- Genus: †Lophopsittacus; Newton, 1875
- Species: †L. mauritianus

Binomial name
- †Lophopsittacus mauritianus (Owen, 1866)
- Location of Mauritius in blue

Synonyms
- Psittacus mauritianus Owen, 1866

= Broad-billed parrot =

Extinct parrot endemic to Mauritius

The broad-billed parrot or raven parrot (Lophopsittacus mauritianus) is a large extinct parrot in the family Psittaculidae. It was endemic to the Mascarene island of Mauritius. The species was first referred to as the "Indian raven" in Dutch ships' journals from 1598 onwards. Only a few brief contemporary descriptions and three depictions are known. It was first scientifically described from a subfossil mandible in 1866, but this was not linked to the old accounts until the rediscovery of a detailed 1601 sketch that matched both the subfossils and the accounts. It is unclear what other species it was most closely related to, but it has been classified as a member of the tribe Psittaculini, along with other Mascarene parrots. It had similarities with the Rodrigues parrot (Necropsittacus rodricanus), and may have been closely related.

The broad-billed parrot's head was large in proportion to its body, and there was a distinct crest of feathers on the front of the head. The bird had a very large beak, comparable in size to that of the hyacinth macaw, which would have enabled it to crack hard seeds. Its bones indicate that the species exhibited greater sexual dimorphism in overall size and head size than any living parrot. The exact colouration is unknown, but a contemporary description indicates that it had multiple colours, including a blue head, and perhaps a red body and beak. It is believed to have been a weak flier, but not flightless. The species became extinct sometime in the late 17th century due to deforestation, predation by introduced invasive species, and possibly hunting.

== Taxonomy ==
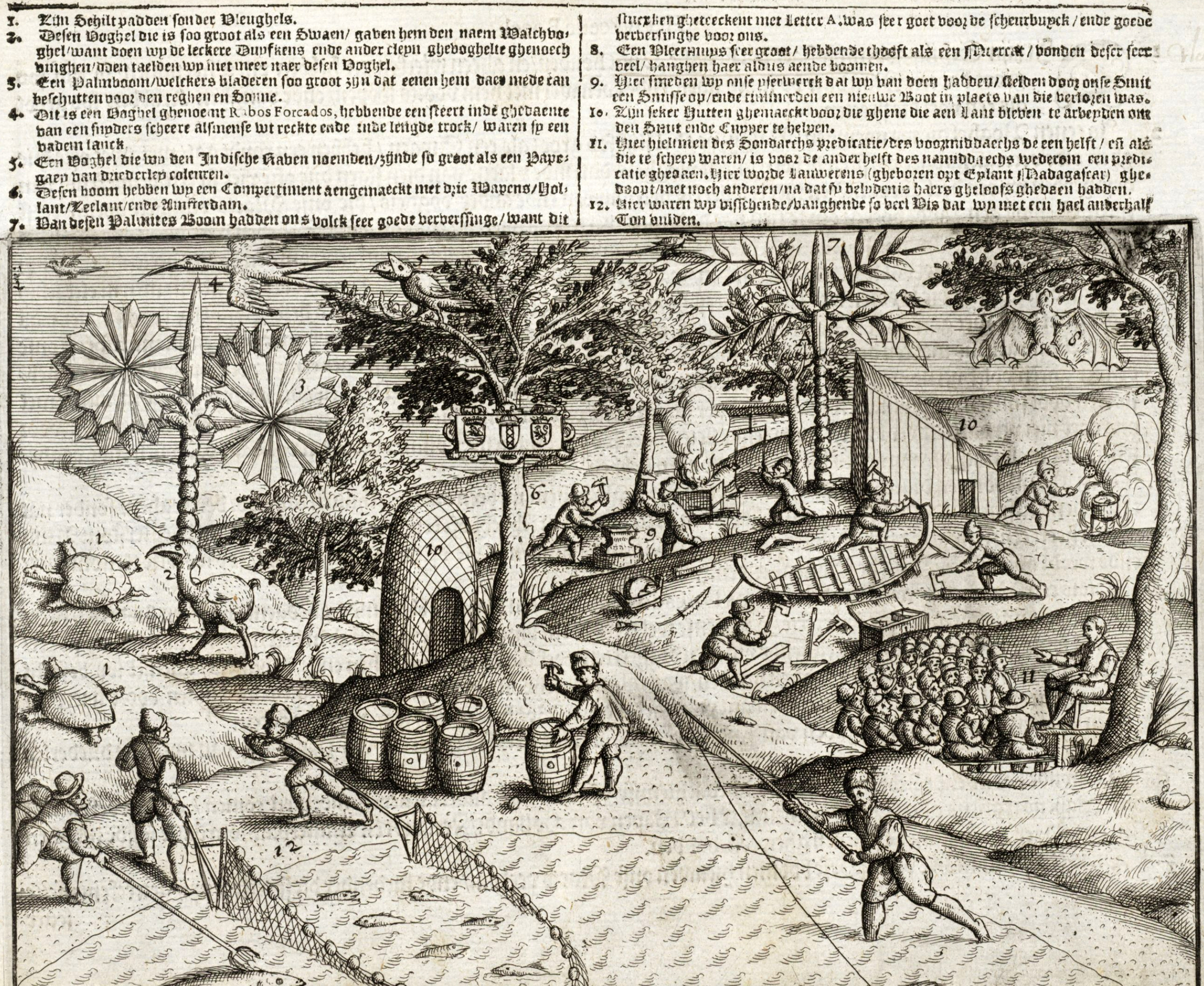
Woodcut from 1601, with the first published depiction of a broad-billed parrot (5, perched in a tree above).

The earliest known descriptions of the broad-billed parrot were provided by Dutch travellers during the Second Dutch Expedition to Indonesia, led by the Dutch Admiral Jacob Cornelis van Neck in 1598. They appear in reports published in 1601, which also contain the first illustration of the bird, along with the first of a dodo. The description for the illustration reads: "5* Is a bird which we called the Indian Crow, more than twice as big as the parroquets, of two or three colours". The Dutch sailors who visited Mauritius categorised the broad-billed parrots separately from parrots, and referred to them as "Indische ravens" (translated as either "Indian ravens" or "Indian crows") without accompanying useful descriptions, which caused confusion when their journals were studied. The Dutch painter Jacob Savery lived in a house in Amsterdam called "In de Indische Rave" (Dutch for "in the Indian raven") until 1602, since Dutch houses had signboards instead of numbers at the time. While he and his brother, the painter Roelant Savery, did not paint this species and it does not appear to have been transported from Mauritius, they may have read about it or heard about it from the latter's contacts in the court of Emperor Rudolf II (Roelant painted other extinct Mauritian species in the emperor's menagerie).

The British naturalist Hugh Edwin Strickland assigned the "Indian ravens" to the hornbill genus Buceros in 1848, because he interpreted the projection on the forehead in the 1601 illustration as a horn. The Dutch and the French also referred to South American macaws as "Indian ravens" during the 17th century, and the name was used for hornbills by Dutch, French, and English speakers in the East Indies. The British traveller Sir Thomas Herbert referred to the broad-billed parrot as "Cacatoes" (cockatoo) in 1634, with the description "birds like Parrats [sic], fierce and indomitable", but naturalists did not realise that he was referring to the same bird. Even after subfossils of a parrot matching the descriptions were found, the French zoologist Emile Oustalet argued in 1897 that the "Indian raven" was a hornbill whose remains awaited discovery. The Mauritian ornithologist France Staub was in favour of this idea as late as 1993. No remains of hornbills have ever been found on the island, and apart from an extinct species from New Caledonia, hornbills are not found on any oceanic islands.

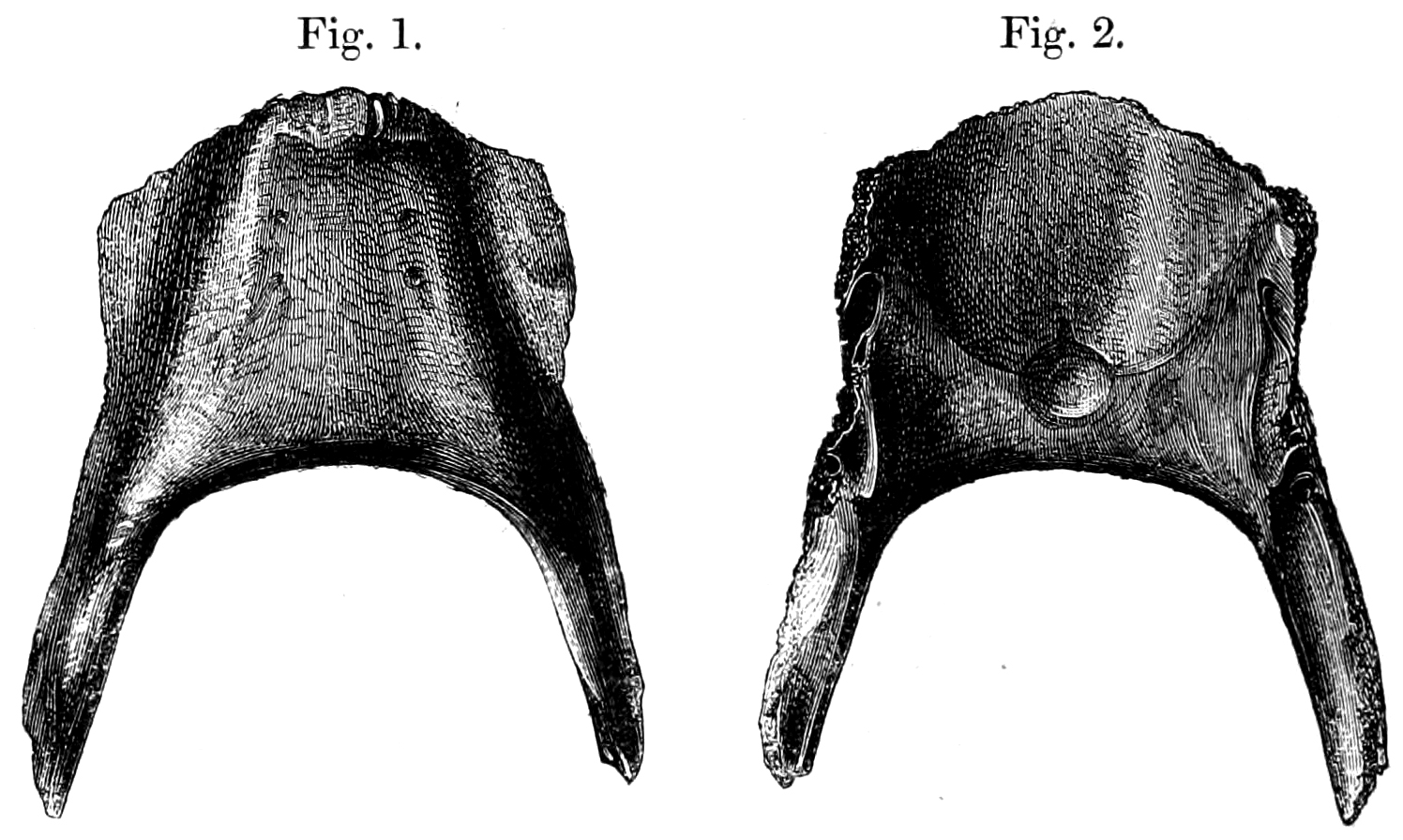
Lithograph of the now lost subfossil holotype mandible, 1866

The first known physical remain of the broad-billed parrot was a subfossil mandible collected along with the first batch of dodo bones found in the Mare aux Songes swamp. The British biologist Richard Owen described the mandible in 1866 and identified it as belonging to a large parrot species, to which he gave the binomial name Psittacus mauritianus. This holotype specimen is now lost. The common name "broad-billed parrot" was first used by Owen in a 1866 lecture. In 1868, shortly after the 1601 journal of the Dutch East India Company ship Gelderland had been rediscovered, the German ornithologist Hermann Schlegel examined an unlabelled pen-and-ink sketch in it. Realising that the drawing, which is attributed to the Dutch artist Joris Joostensz Laerle, depicted the parrot described by Owen, Schlegel made the connection with the old journal descriptions. Because its bones and crest are significantly different from those of Psittacus species, the British zoologist Alfred Newton assigned it to its own genus in 1875, which he called Lophopsittacus. Lophos is the Ancient Greek word for crest, referring here to the bird's frontal crest, and psittakos means parrot. More fossils were found in the swamp under the direction of the French naturalist Theodore Sauzier in 1889, and described by the British ornithologists Edward Newton and Hans Gadow in 1893. These included previously unknown elements such as the sternum (breast-bone), femur, metatarsus, and a lower jaw larger than the one that was originally described.

In 1967, the American ornithologist James Greenway speculated that reports of grey Mauritian parrots referred to the broad-billed parrot. In 1973, based on remains collected by the French amateur naturalist Louis Etienne Thirioux in the early 20th century, the British ornithologist Daniel T. Holyoak placed a small subfossil Mauritian parrot in the same genus as the broad-billed parrot and named it Lophopsittacus bensoni. In 2007, on the basis of a comparison of subfossils, and correlated with old descriptions of small grey parrots, the British palaeontologist Julian Hume reclassified it as a species in the genus Psittacula and called it Thirioux's grey parrot. Hume also reidentified a skull found by Thirioux that was originally assigned to the Rodrigues parrot (Necropsittacus rodricanus) as belonging to the broad-billed parrot instead, making it only the second skull known of this species.

=== Evolution ===
The taxonomic affinities of the broad-billed parrot are undetermined. Considering its large jaws and other osteological features, Newton and Gadow thought it to be closely related to the Rodrigues parrot in 1893, but were unable to determine whether they both belonged in the same genus, since a crest was only known from the latter. The British ornithologist Graham S. Cowles instead found their skulls too dissimilar for them to be close relatives in 1987.

Many endemic Mascarene birds, including the dodo, are derived from South Asian ancestors, and the British ecologist Anthony S. Cheke and Hume have proposed that this may be the case for all the parrots there as well. Sea levels were lower during the Pleistocene, so it was possible for species to colonise some of the then less isolated islands. Although most extinct parrot species of the Mascarenes are poorly known, subfossil remains show that they shared features such as enlarged heads and jaws, reduced pectoral bones, and robust leg bones. Hume has suggested that they have a common origin in the radiation of the tribe Psittaculini, basing this theory on morphological features and the fact that parrots from that group have managed to colonise many isolated islands in the Indian Ocean. The Psittaculini may have invaded the area several times, as many of the species were so specialised that they may have evolved significantly on hotspot islands before the Mascarenes emerged from the sea.

== Description ==
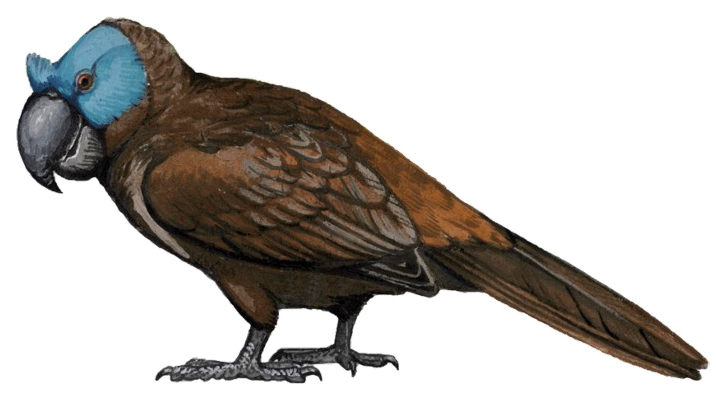
Life restoration by Julian P. Hume, with colouration based on contemporary accounts

The broad-billed parrot had a disproportionately large head and jaws, and the skull was flattened from top to bottom, unlike in other Mascarene parrots. Ridges on the skull indicate that its distinct frontal crest of feathers was firmly attached, and that the bird, unlike cockatoos, could not raise or lower it. The width of the hind edge of the mandibular symphysis (where the two halves of the lower jaw connected) indicate that the jaws were comparatively broad. The 1601 Gelderland sketch was examined in 2003 by Hume, who compared the ink finish with the underlying pencil sketch and found that the latter showed several additional details. The pencil sketch depicts the crest as a tuft of rounded feathers attached to the front of the head at the base of the beak, and shows rounded wings with long primary covert feathers, large secondary feathers, and a slightly bifurcated tail, with the two central feathers longer than the rest. Measurements of some of the first known bones show that the mandible was 65–78 millimetres (2.6–3.1 in) in length, 65 mm (2.6 in) in width, the femur was 58–63 mm (2.3–2.5 in) in length, the tibia was 88–99 mm (3.5–3.9 in), and the metatarsus 35 mm (1.4 in). The sternum was relatively reduced.

Subfossils show that the males were larger, measuring 55–65 centimetres (22–26 in) to the females' 45–55 cm (18–22 in). The sexual dimorphism in size between male and female skulls is the largest among parrots. Differences in the bones of the rest of the body and limbs are less pronounced; nevertheless, it had greater sexual dimorphism in overall size than any living parrot. The size differences between the two birds in the 1601 sketch may be due to this feature. A 1602 account by the Dutch sailor Reyer Cornelisz has traditionally been interpreted as the only contemporary mention of size differences among broad-billed parrots, listing "large and small Indian crows" among the animals of the island. A full transcript of the original text was only published in 2003, and showed that a comma had been incorrectly placed in the English translation; "large and small" instead referred to "field-hens", possibly the red rail and the smaller Cheke's wood rail.

=== Possible colouration ===
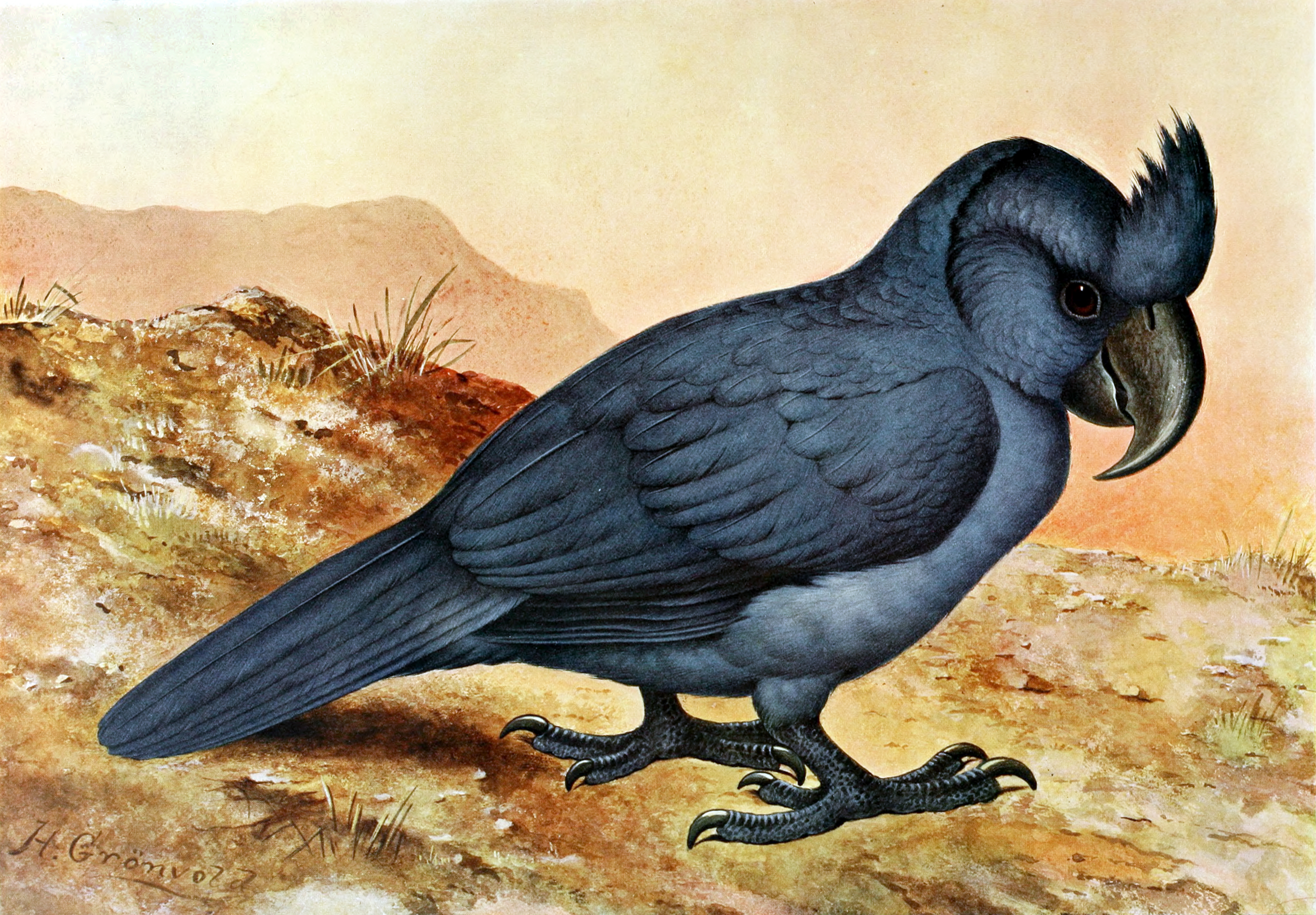
1907 restoration by Henrik Grönvold (based on the Gelderland sketch), inaccurately showing the bird as entirely blue; the body probably had a different colour in reality

There has been some confusion over the colouration of the broad-billed parrot. The report of van Neck's 1598 voyage, published in 1601, contained the first illustration of the parrot, with a caption stating that the bird had "two or three colours". The last account of the bird, and the only mention of specific colours, was by the German preacher Johann Christian Hoffman in 1673–75:

There are also geese, flamingos, three species of pigeon of varied colours, mottled and green perroquets, red crows with recurved beaks and with blue heads, which fly with difficulty and have received from the Dutch the name of Indian crow.

In spite of the mention of several colours, authors such as the British naturalist Walter Rothschild claimed that the Gelderland journal described the bird as entirely blue-grey, and it was restored this way in Rothschild's 1907 book Extinct Birds. Examination of the journal by Hume in 2003 revealed only a description of the dodo. He suggested that the distinctively drawn facial mask may represent a separate colour. Hume suggested in 1987 that in addition to size dimorphism, the sexes may have had different colours, which would explain some of the discrepancies in the old descriptions. The head was evidently blue, and in 2007, Hume suggested the beak may have been red, and the rest of the plumage greyish or blackish, which also occurs in other members of Psittaculini.

In 2015, a translation of the 1660s report of the Dutch soldier Johannes Pretorius about his stay on Mauritius (from 1666 to 1669) was published, wherein he described the bird as "very beautifully coloured". Hume accordingly reinterpreted Hoffman's account, and suggested the bird may have been brightly coloured with a red body, blue head, and red beak; the bird was illustrated as such in the paper. Possible iridescent or glossy feathers that changed appearance according to angle of light may also have given the impression that it had even more colours. The Australian ornithologist Joseph M. Forshaw agreed in 2017 that the bill was red (at least in males), but interpreted Hoffman's account as suggesting a more subdued reddish-brown colouration in general, with a pale bluish-grey head, similar to the Mascarene parrot.

== Behaviour and ecology ==
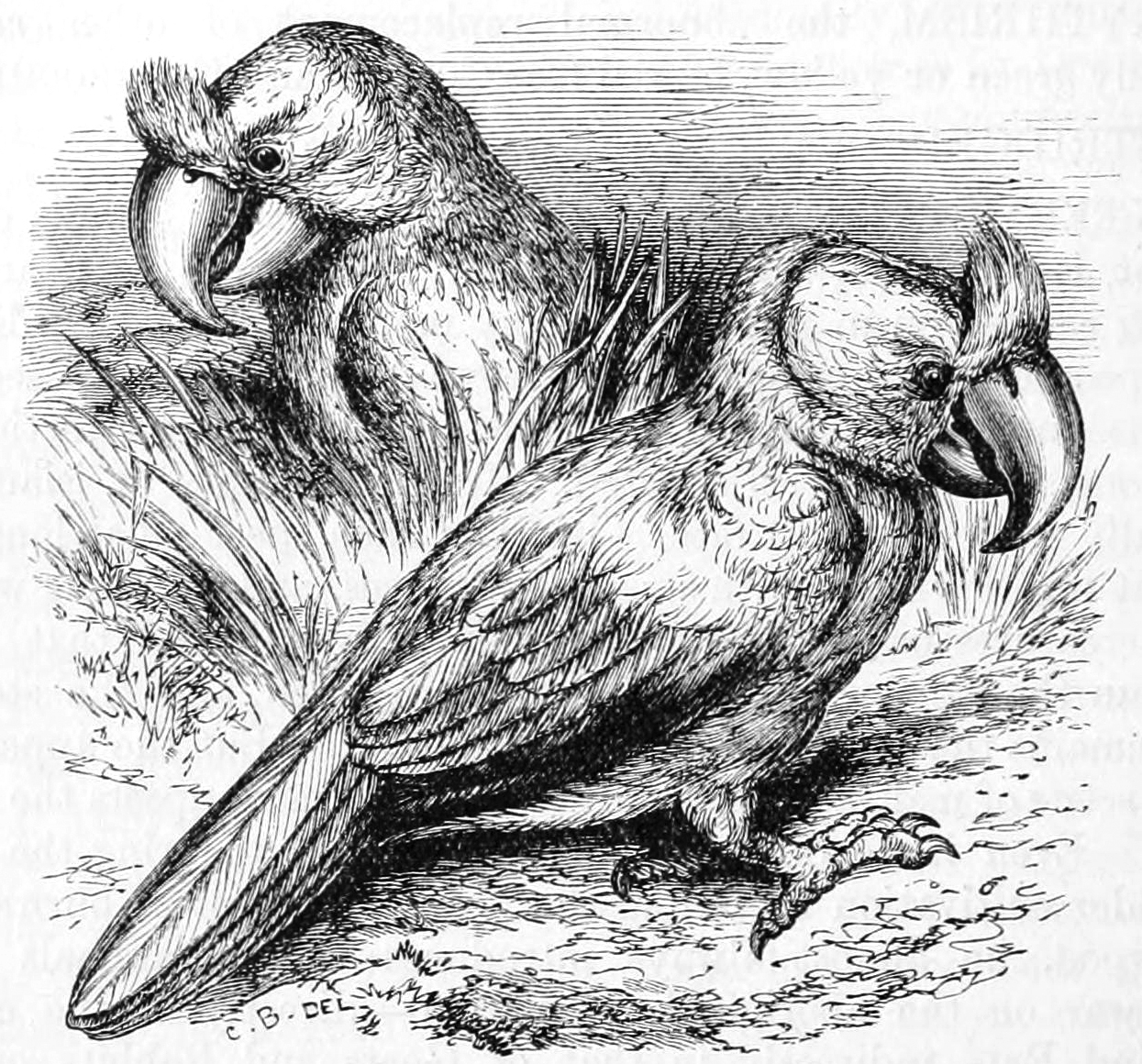
Illustration based on a tracing of the Gelderland sketch, 1896

Pretorius kept various now-extinct Mauritian birds in captivity, and described the behaviour of the broad-billed parrot as follows:

The Indian ravens are very beautifully coloured. They cannot fly and are not often found. This kind is a very bad tempered bird. When captive it refuses to eat. It would prefer to die rather than to live in captivity.

Though the broad-billed parrot may have fed on the ground and been a weak flier, its tarsometatarsus (lower leg bone) was short and stout, implying some arboreal (tree-dwelling) characteristics. The Newton brothers and many authors after them inferred that it was flightless, due to the apparent short wings and large size shown in the 1601 Gelderland sketch. According to Hume, the underlying pencil sketch actually shows that the wings are not particularly short. They appear broad, as they commonly are in forest-adapted species, and the alula appears large, a feature of slow-flying birds. Its sternal keel was reduced, but not enough to prevent flight, as the adept flying Cyanoramphus parrots also have reduced keels, and even the flightless kākāpō, with its vestigial keel, is capable of gliding. Furthermore, Hoffman's account states that it could fly, albeit with difficulty, and the first published illustration shows the bird on top of a tree, an improbable position for a flightless bird. The broad-billed parrot may have been behaviourally near-flightless, like the now-extinct Norfolk Island kaka.

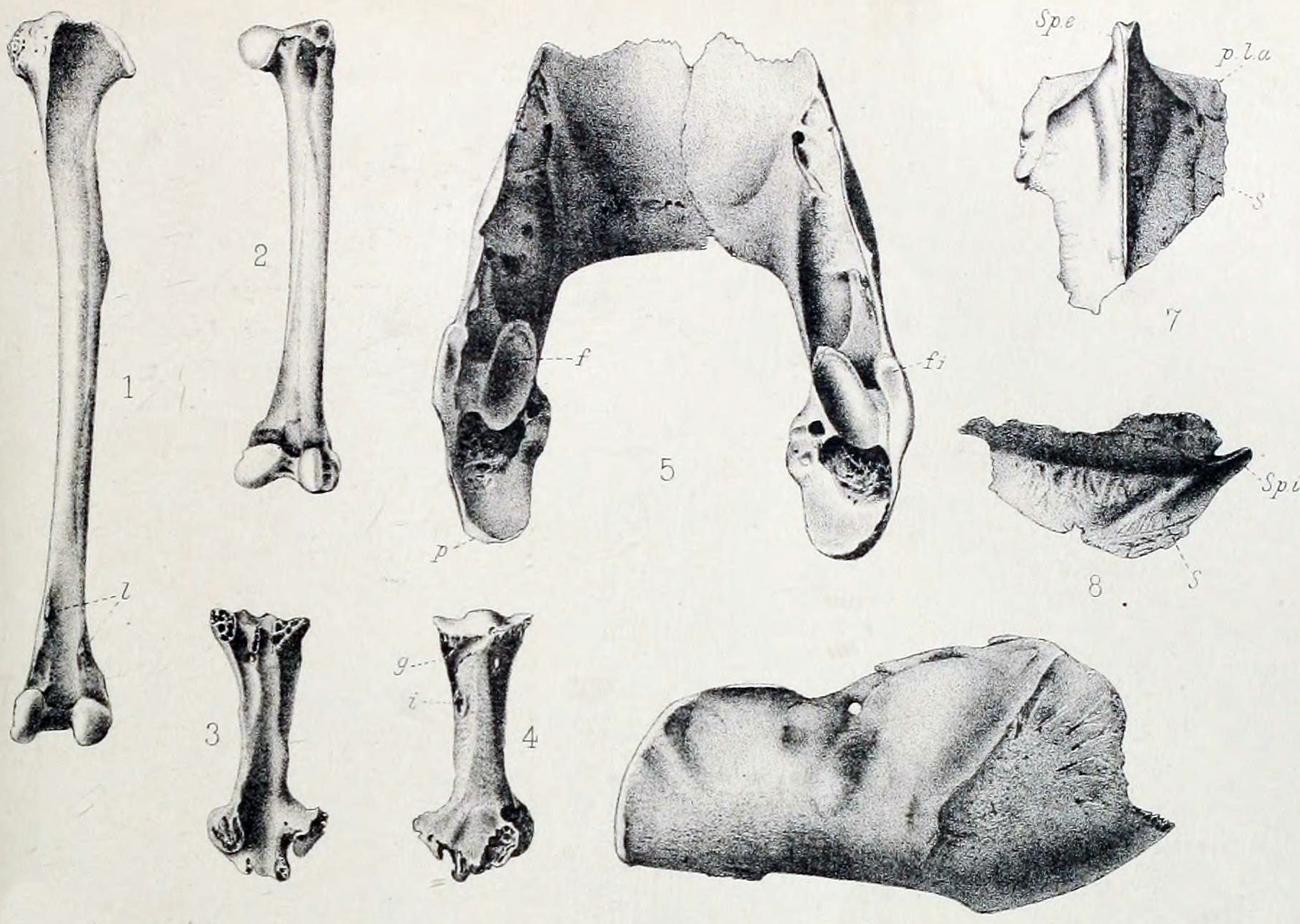
Subfossil leg bones, a mandible, and a sternum, 1893

Sexual dimorphism in beak size may have affected behaviour. Such dimorphism is common in other parrots, for example in the palm cockatoo and the New Zealand kaka. In species where it occurs, the sexes prefer food of different sizes, the males use their beaks in rituals, or the sexes have specialised roles in nesting and rearing. Similarly, the large difference between male and female head size may have been reflected in the ecology of each sex, though it is impossible to determine how.

In 1953, the Japanese ornithologist Masauji Hachisuka suggested the broad-billed parrot was nocturnal, like the kākāpō and the night parrot, two extant ground-dwelling parrots. Contemporary accounts do not corroborate this, and the orbits are of similar size to those of other large diurnal parrots. The broad-billed parrot was recorded on the dry leeward side of Mauritius, which was the most accessible for people, and it was noted that birds were more abundant near the coast, which may indicate that the fauna of such areas was more diverse. It may have nested in tree cavities or rocks, like the Cuban amazon. The terms raven or crow may have been suggested by the bird's harsh call, its behavioural traits, or just its dark plumage. The following description by the Dutch bookkeeper Jacob Granaet from 1666 mentions some of the broad-billed parrot's co-inhabitants of the forests, and might indicate its demeanour:

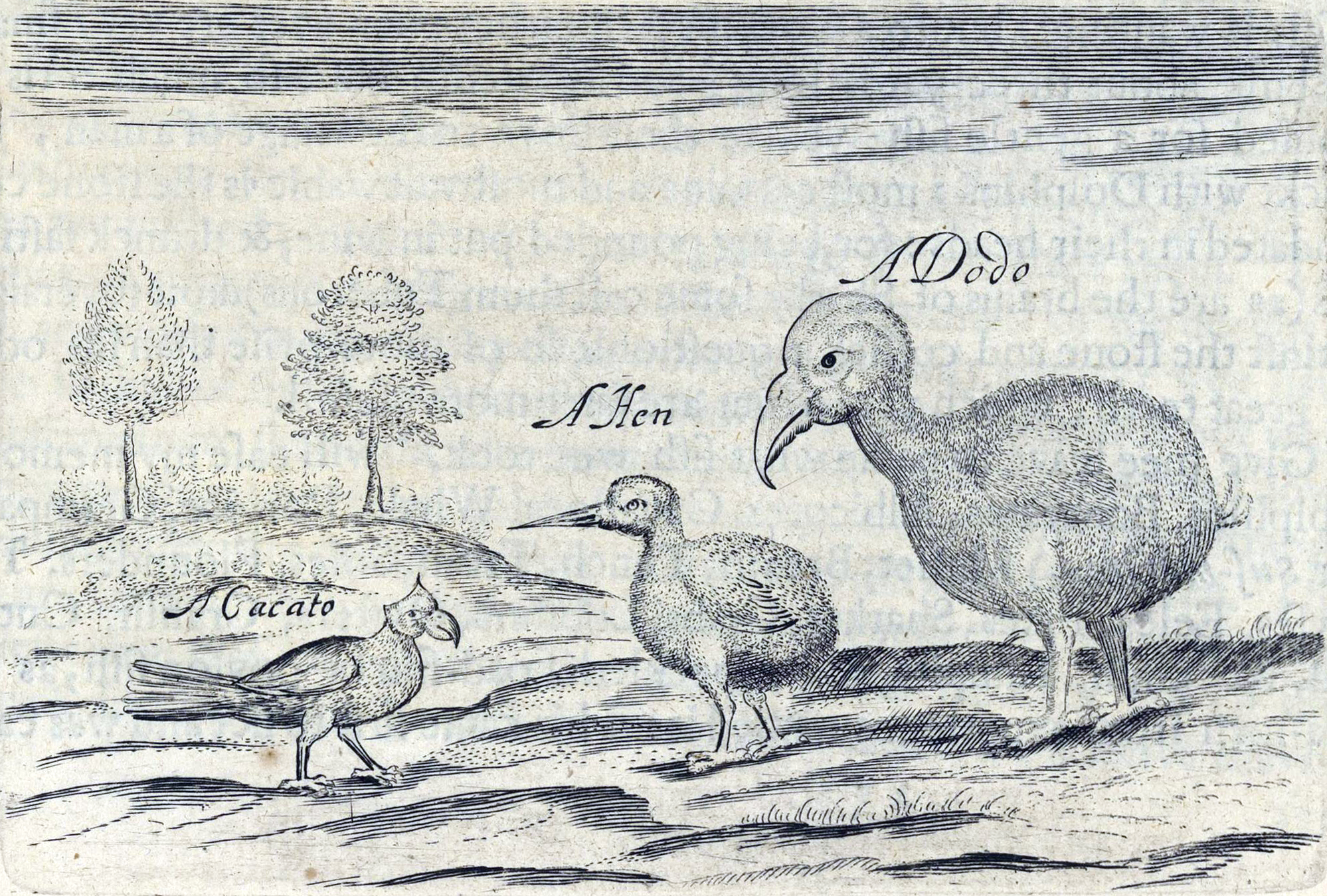
Sketch by Sir Thomas Herbert from 1634 showing a broad-billed parrot ("Cacato"), a red rail, and a dodo

Within the forest dwell parrots, turtle and other wild doves, mischievous and unusually large ravens [broad-billed parrots], falcons, bats and other birds whose name I do not know, never having seen before.

Many other endemic species of Mauritius were lost after human colonisation, so the ecosystem of the island is severely damaged and hard to conserve. Before humans arrived, Mauritius was entirely covered in forests, almost all of which have since been lost to deforestation. The surviving endemic fauna is still seriously threatened. The broad-billed parrot lived alongside other recently extinct Mauritian birds such as the dodo, the red rail, the Mascarene grey parakeet, the Mauritius blue pigeon, the Mauritius scops owl, the Mascarene coot, the Mauritius sheldgoose, the Mascarene teal, and the Mauritius night heron. Extinct Mauritian reptiles include the saddle-backed Mauritius giant tortoise, the domed Mauritius giant tortoise, the Mauritian giant skink, and the Round Island burrowing boa. The small Mauritian flying fox and the snail Tropidophora carinata lived on Mauritius and Réunion but became extinct in both islands. Some plants, such as Casearia tinifolia and the palm orchid, have also become extinct.

=== Diet and feeding ===
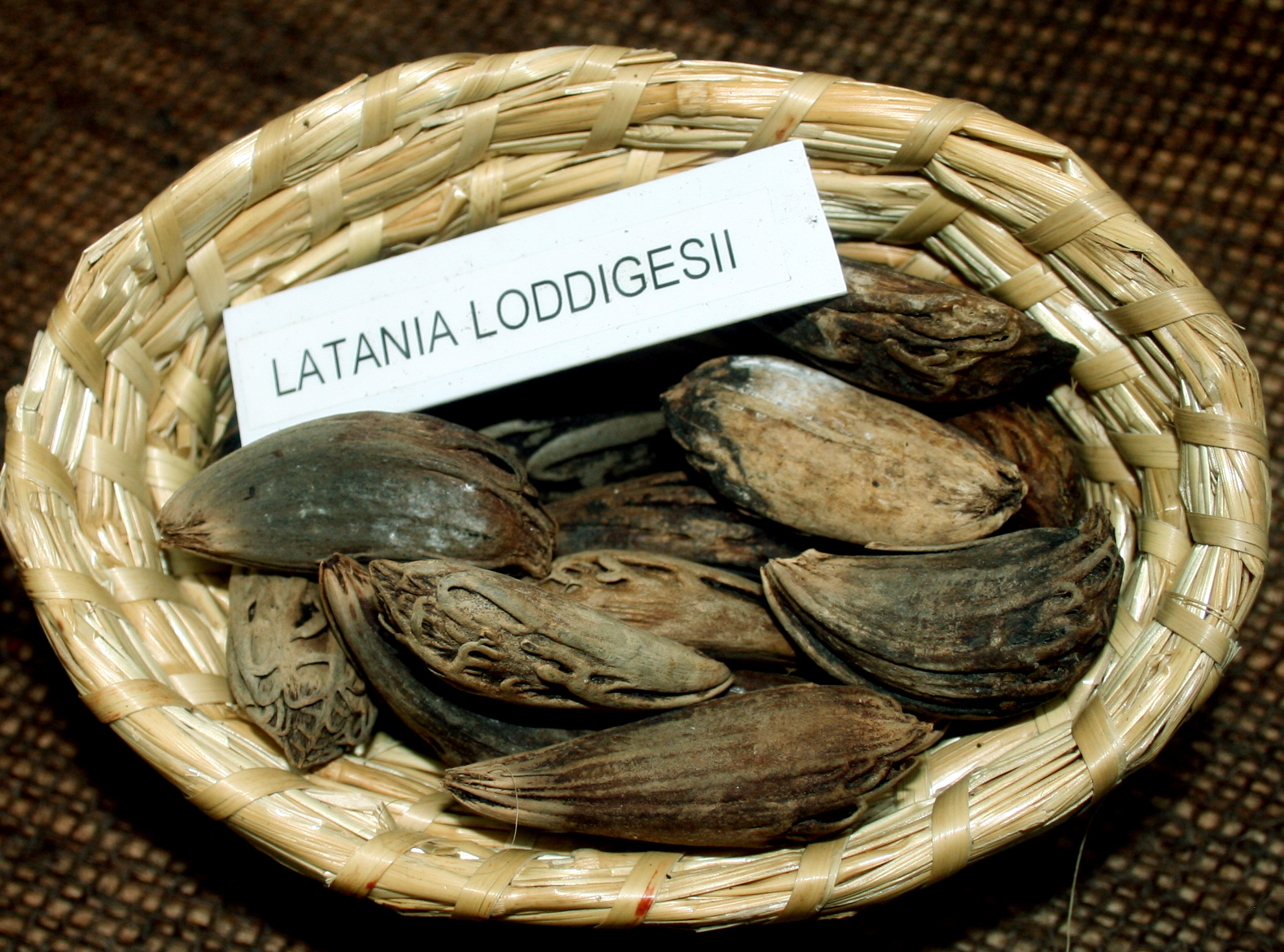
Seeds of Latania loddigesii, perhaps part of this parrot's diet

Species that are morphologically similar to the broad-billed parrot, such as the hyacinth macaw and the palm cockatoo, may provide insight into its ecology. Anodorhynchus macaws, which are habitual ground dwellers, eat very hard palm nuts. Many types of palms and palm-like plants on Mauritius produce hard seeds that the broad-billed parrot may have eaten, including Latania loddigesii, Mimusops maxima, Sideroxylon grandiflorum, Diospyros egrettorium, and Pandanus utilis. The biologist Joanna K. Carpenter and colleagues stated in 2020 that extinct Mascarene birds like the broad-billed parrot, the dodo, and the Rodrigues solitaire could only reach seeds at low heights, and were therefore probably important seed dispersers, able to destroy the largest seeds among the Mascarene flora.

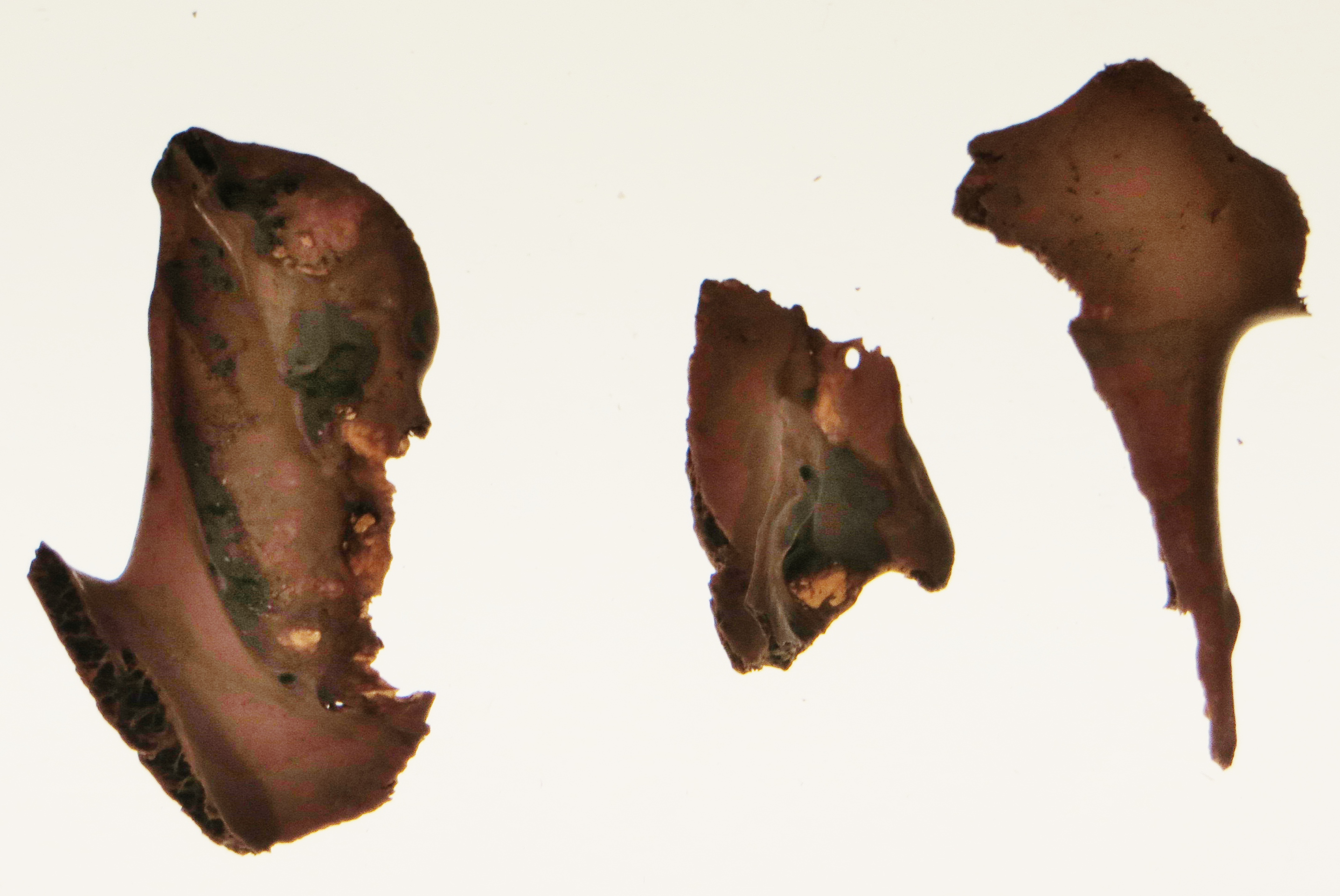
Mandible fragments in Naturalis

On the basis of radiographs, Holyoak claimed that the mandible of the broad-billed parrot was weakly constructed and suggested that it would have fed on soft fruits rather than hard seeds. As evidence, he pointed out that the internal trabeculae were widely spaced, that the upper bill was broad whereas the palatines were narrow, and the fact that no preserved upper rostrum had been discovered, which he attributed to its delicateness. The British ornithologist George A. Smith, however, pointed out that the four genera Holyoak used as examples of "strong jawed" parrots based on radiographs, Cyanorhamphus, Melopsittacus, Neophema and Psephotus, actually have weak jaws in life, and that the morphologies cited by Holyoak do not indicate strength. Hume pointed out in 2007 that the mandible morphology of the broad-billed parrot is comparable to that of the largest living parrot, the hyacinth macaw, which cracks open palm nuts with ease. It is therefore probable that the broad-billed parrot fed in the same manner.

The Brazilian ornithologist Carlos Yamashita suggested in 1997 that macaws once depended on now-extinct South American megafauna to eat fruits and excrete the seeds, and that they later relied on domesticated cattle to do this. Similarly, in Australasia the palm cockatoo feeds on undigested seeds from cassowary droppings. Yamashita also suggested that the abundant Cylindraspis tortoises and dodos performed the same function on Mauritius, and that the broad-billed parrot, with its macaw-like beak, depended on them to obtain cleaned seeds. In 2023, the biologist Julia H. Heinen and colleagues noted that the loss of the broad-billed parrot (which probably preferred large seeds and fruits) and other native frugivores had a negative impact on seed dispersal of native plants due to the lack of species with their gape size, and that seed-handling of introduced species was ecologically different, and therefore does not restore this functionality there.

== Extinction ==
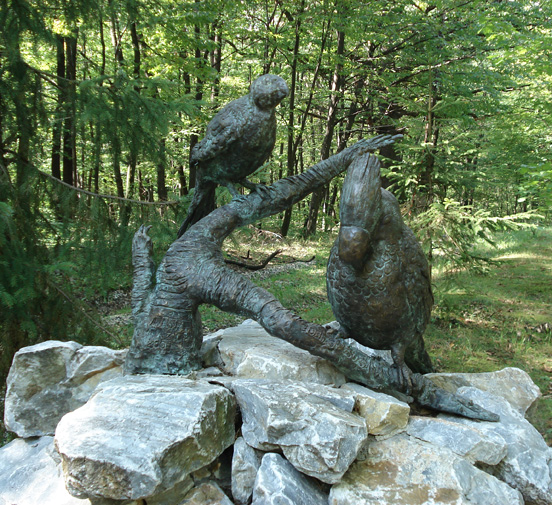
Statues in Hungary of Newton's parakeet and the broad-billed parrot

Though Mauritius had previously been visited by Arab vessels in the Middle Ages and Portuguese ships between 1507 and 1513, they did not settle on the island. The Dutch Empire acquired the island in 1598, renaming it after the Dutch stadtholder Maurice of Nassau, and it was used from then on for the provisioning of trade vessels of the Dutch East India Company. To the Dutch sailors who visited Mauritius from 1598 and onwards, the fauna was mainly interesting from a culinary standpoint. Of the eight or so parrot species endemic to the Mascarenes, only the echo parakeet of Mauritius has survived. The others were likely all made extinct by a combination of excessive hunting and deforestation.

Because of its poor flying ability, large size and possible island tameness, Hume stated in 2007 the broad-billed parrot was easy prey for sailors who visited Mauritius, and their nests would have been extremely vulnerable to predation by introduced crab-eating macaques and rats. Various sources indicate the bird was aggressive, which may explain why it held out so long against introduced animals after all. The bird is believed to have become extinct by the 1680s, when the palms it may have sustained itself on were harvested on a large scale. Unlike other parrot species, which were often taken as pets by sailors, there are no records of broad-billed parrots being transported from Mauritius either live or dead, perhaps because of the stigma associated with ravens. The birds would not in any case have survived such a journey if they refused to eat anything but seeds. Cheke pointed out in 2013 that hunting of this species was never reported and that deforestation was minimal at the time. He also suggested that old birds would have survived long after reproduction was possible.
