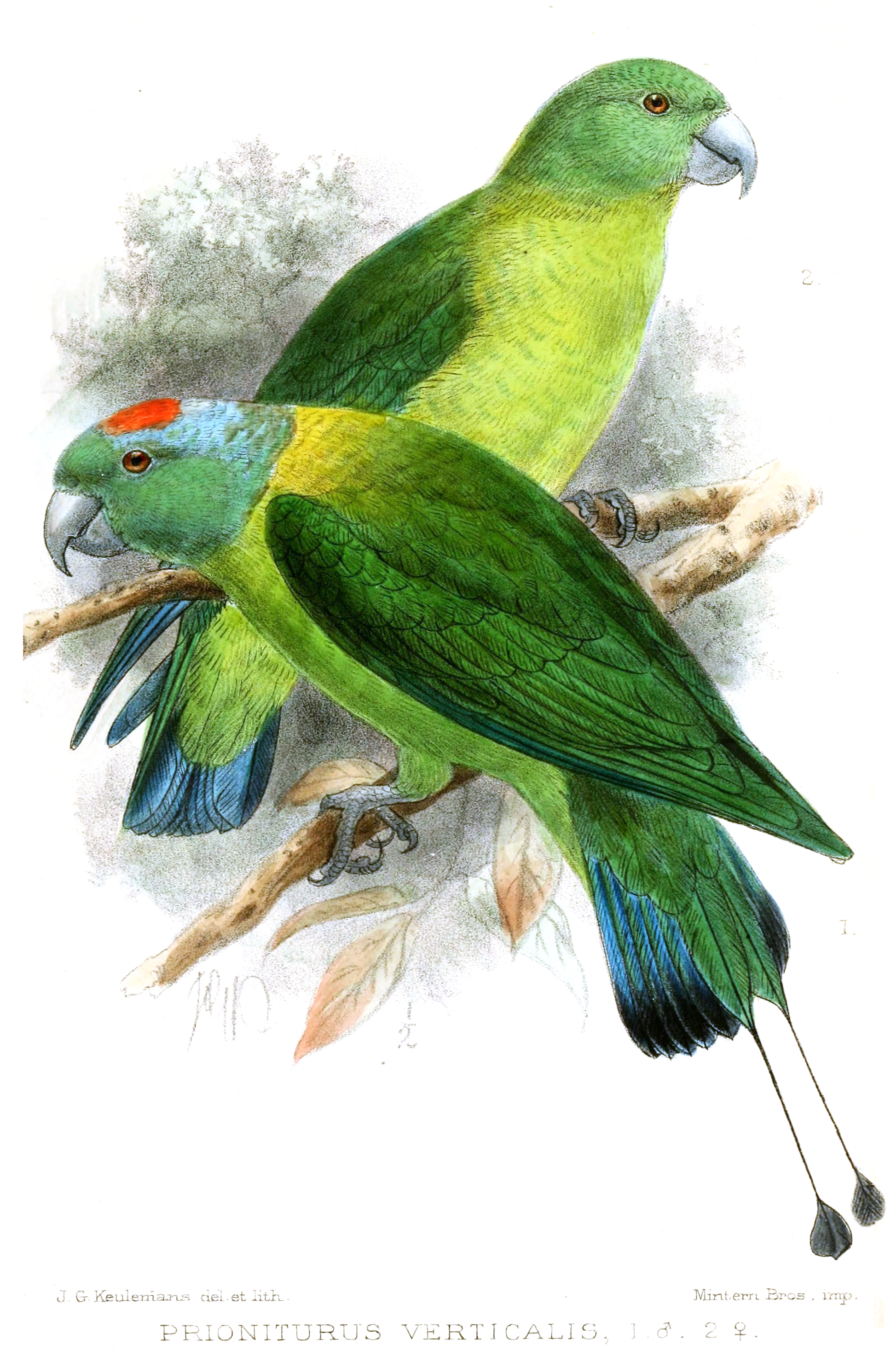
- Illustration by Keulemans

Conservation status
- Critically Endangered (IUCN 3.1)

Scientific classification
- Kingdom: Animalia
- Phylum: Chordata
- Class: Aves
- Order: Psittaciformes
- Family: Psittaculidae
- Genus: Prioniturus
- Species: P. verticalis

Binomial name
- Prioniturus verticalis Sharpe, 1893

= Blue-winged racket-tail =

Species of bird

The blue-winged racket-tail or Sulu racquet-tail (Prioniturus verticalis) is a species of parrot in the family Psittaculidae. It is endemic to Tawi-Tawi island in the Philippines and is one of the most endangered parrots in the world. It is threatened by habitat loss and the poaching for the cage-bird trade.

== Description and taxonomy ==
It has mainly dark green plumage on back, an olive/green on its breast and belly. Male birds have a pale blue with small red patch on its forehead and forecrown. Females look identical to the male except, they do not have a red spot on their forecrown. The primary feathers blue on outer webs while the middle tail feathers green. Racquet feathers black tinged with blue. Their side tail feathers are green tipped black. Their bill has a blue-grey hue.

Most similar to the Montane racket-tail but forehead, sides of head and nape are green. Females also have less blue on their face compared to the Montane racket-tail.

== Ecology and behavior ==
The security situation in the Sulu archipelago has prevented researchers from studying this bird. It is presumed to have a similar diet as all other racquet-tails, feeding on fruit, particularly bananas, flowers and seeds of growing corn, and rice.

Its breeding season is believed to be from September to January. Like all other parrots, it is a cavity nester. A single nest was recorded in a large broken off palm tree in a grove of palms beside a forest.

== Habitat and conservation status ==
Its natural habitats are tropical moist lowland forests and subtropical or tropical mangrove forests. It is now assessed as Critically Endangered by the IUCN Red List with population estimates being just 50 - 249 mature individuals. Its main threat is habitat loss and trapping. Once prevalent throughout all the islands of the Sulu Archipelago, the blue-winged racket-tail is now only found on isolated places on Tawi-Tawi due to rapid habitat destruction during the past 200 years.

One of this bird's threats is its own tame behavior. This tame behavior is taken advantage of by trappers and has made it an easy target to capture for the illegal exotic pet trade. Deforestation of the blue-winged racket-tail's natural habitat to make way for both legal and illegal logging agriculture, mining, and the uncontrolled settlement by humans has destroyed most of this bird's original habitat.
