= Mindoro racket-tail =

Conservation status
- Vulnerable (IUCN 3.1)

Scientific classification
- Kingdom: Animalia
- Phylum: Chordata
- Class: Aves
- Order: Psittaciformes
- Family: Psittaculidae
- Genus: Prioniturus
- Species: P. mindorensis

Binomial name
- Prioniturus mindorensis Steere, 1890

Species of bird

The Mindoro racket-tail (Prioniturus mindorensis) is a species of parrot in the Psittaculinae family. It was formerly considered conspecific with the blue-crowned racket-tail (Prioniturus discurus). It is endemic to the island of Mindoro in the Philippines and it occurs in tropical moist lowland forest. It is threatened by habitat loss and trapping for the cage-bird trade.

== Description and taxonomy ==
This is a species of medium sized parrot found in the lowland and foothill forests of Mindoro. It is primarily green with a darker back and paler underparts. It has a deep blue central crown and a dark blue hind-crown and wing edges. It also has a pale beak and gray eyes. Like all racquet-tails it has two long and strand like feathers that end with a circular racquet-tailed shape. This species exhibits sexual dimorphism in which females have shorter "rackets". Juveniles are similar to adults but have less blue on crown and does not have racquets.

This species was formerly conspecific with Blue-crowned racket-tail but it is differentiated mostly with by its crown, the Mindoro racket-tail has a bluer hindcrown and an even darker hindcrown versus the more uniform color the latter. It also has a more matte green face. Its tail is also slightly longer. It also has pale eyes, although this observation is often is not listed in literature as most of the taxonomic work was done with museum specimens which do not often preserve the eye. This split was reinforced by genetic findings.

== Ecology and behavior ==
There are no species specific studies that have been conducted on the Mindoro racquet-tail. It is presumed to have a similar diet as all other racquet-tails, feeding on fruit, particularly bananas, flowers and seeds of growing corn, and rice.

Like all other parrots, it is a cavity nester. A single nest was recorded in a tree cavity in May.

== Habitat and conservation status ==
It inhabits mainly tropical moist lowland forest but has been known to inhabit moist montane forest up to 1,670 meters above sea level, and has been to known to visit cultivated areas.

IUCN has assessed this bird as vulnerable with its population being estimated as 2,500 to 9,999 mature individuals. It is threatened by habitat loss through legal and illegal logging, mining, road construction, slash-and-burn or kaingin and trapping for both food and the pet trade. By 1988, extensive deforestation on Mindoro had reduced forest cover to a mere 120km^{2}, of which only a small proportion is below this species's upper altitudinal limit. The lowland forest that does remain is highly fragmented. Slash-and-burn cultivation, occasional selective logging and rattan collection threaten the forest fragments that still support the species. Dynamite blasting for marble is an additional threat to forest at Puerto Galera.

Conservation actions proposed are to survey to quantify the population. Study the species's habitat requirements. Assess the level of threat from trapping pressure. Use remote sensing techniques to track land-use change on Mindoro. Carry out awareness-raising activities to reduce trapping activities.
