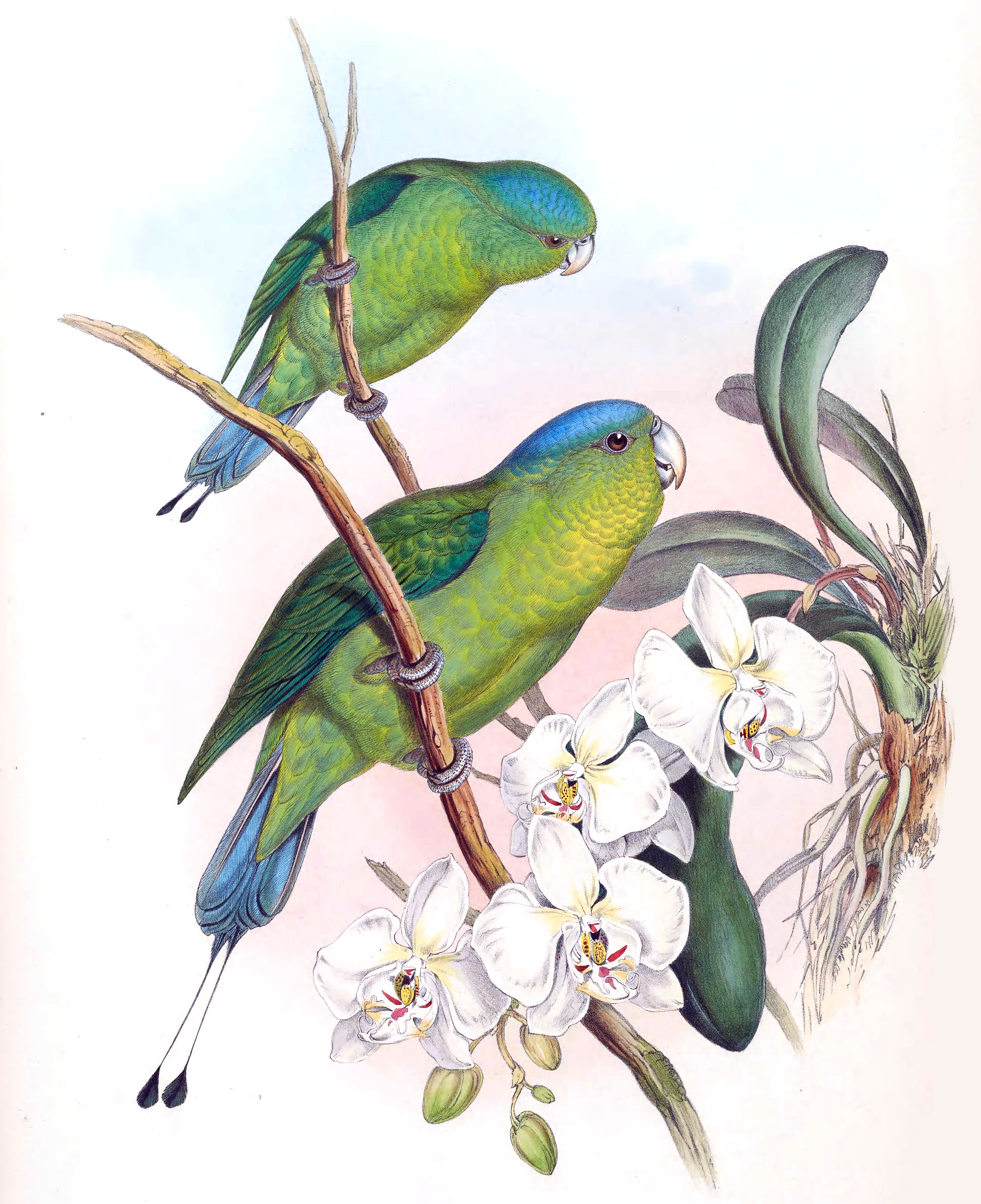
- Blue-crowned racket-tail

Scientific classification
- Kingdom: Animalia
- Phylum: Chordata
- Class: Aves
- Order: Psittaciformes
- Family: Psittaculidae
- Tribe: Psittaculini
- Genus: Prioniturus; Wagler, 1832

Type species
- Psittacus platurus Vieillot, 1818

= Racket-tail =

Racket-tails

Genus of birds

The genus Prioniturus, commonly known as racket-tails, contains ten species in the parrot family Psittaculidae that are found in the Philippines and Indonesia. They are easily distinguished from all other parrots by their elongated central tail feathers with the bare shaft and spatula at the end.

== Taxonomy ==
The genus Prioniturus was introduced in 1832 by the German naturalist Johann Georg Wagler to accommodate a single species, Psittacus platurus Vieillot, the golden-mantled racket-tail. This is the type species of the genus. The word Prioniturus combines the genus name Prionites introduced for the motmots by the German zoologist Johann Illiger in 1811, with the Ancient Greek -οὐρά (-ourá), meaning "tail".

The genus contains the following ten species:

Image	Common name	Scientific name	Distribution
	Buru racket-tail	Prioniturus mada	Buru (central west Moluccas)
	Golden-mantled racket-tail	Prioniturus platurus	Sulawesi, satellites and Celebes Sea islands.
	Mindanao racket-tail	Prioniturus waterstradti	Montane Mindanao (south Philippines)
	Montane racket-tail	Prioniturus montanus	Montane north Luzon (north Philippines)
	Blue-headed racket-tail	Prioniturus platenae	Palawan group (southwest Philippines)
	Mindoro racket-tail	Prioniturus mindorensis	Mindoro (central north Philippines)
	Blue-winged racket-tail	Prioniturus verticalis	Sulu Archipelago (south Philippines)
	Yellow-breasted racket-tail	Prioniturus flavicans	North Sulawesi, Bangka Island and Lembeh (north, east of northeast Sulawesi) and Togian Islands (between northeast and central east Sulawesi)
120px	Green racket-tail	Prioniturus luconensis	Luzon (north Philippines)
120px	Blue-crowned racket-tail	Prioniturus discurus	Philippines (except north Luzon, Mindoro and Palawan group)
