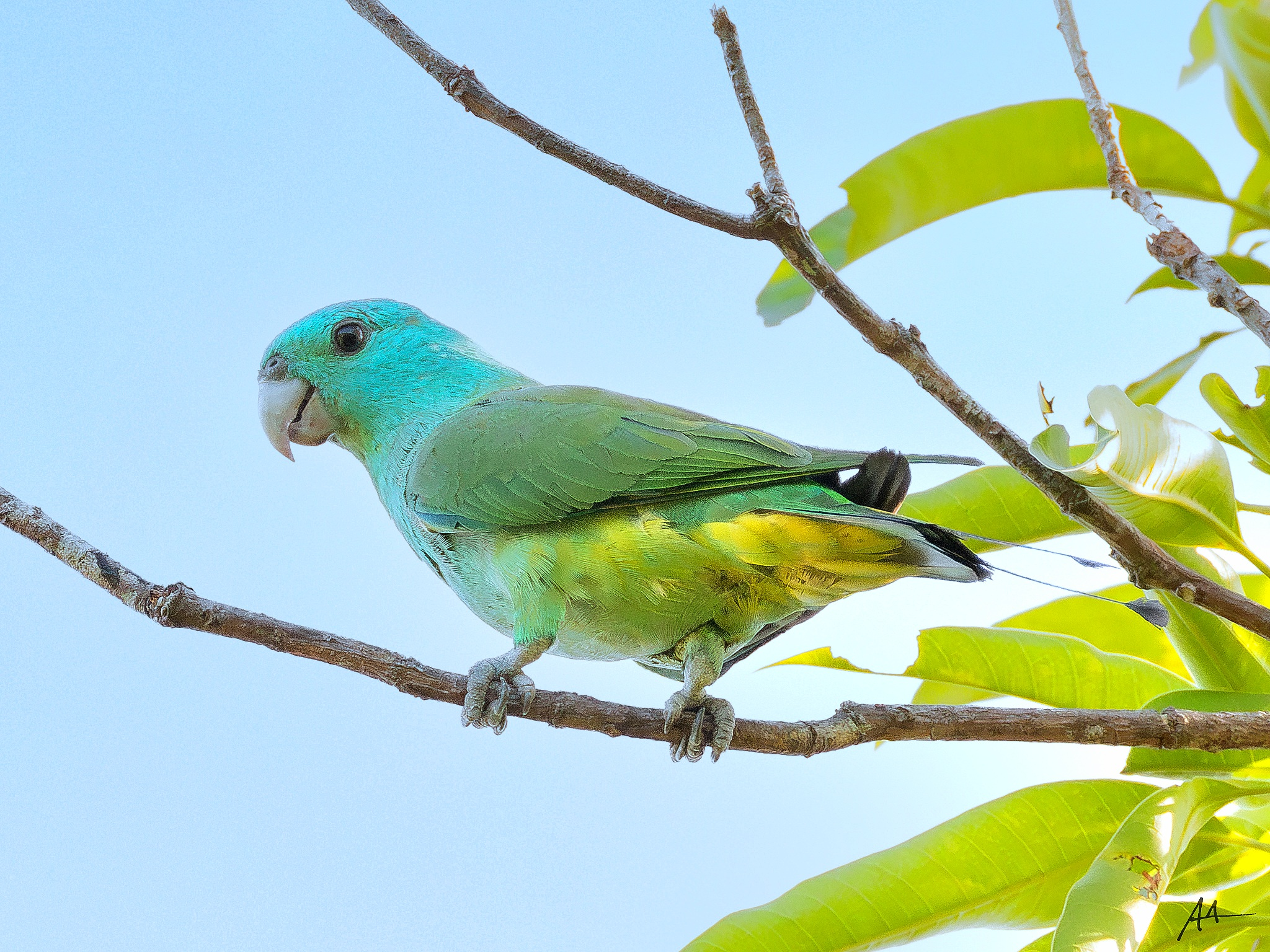
- Male
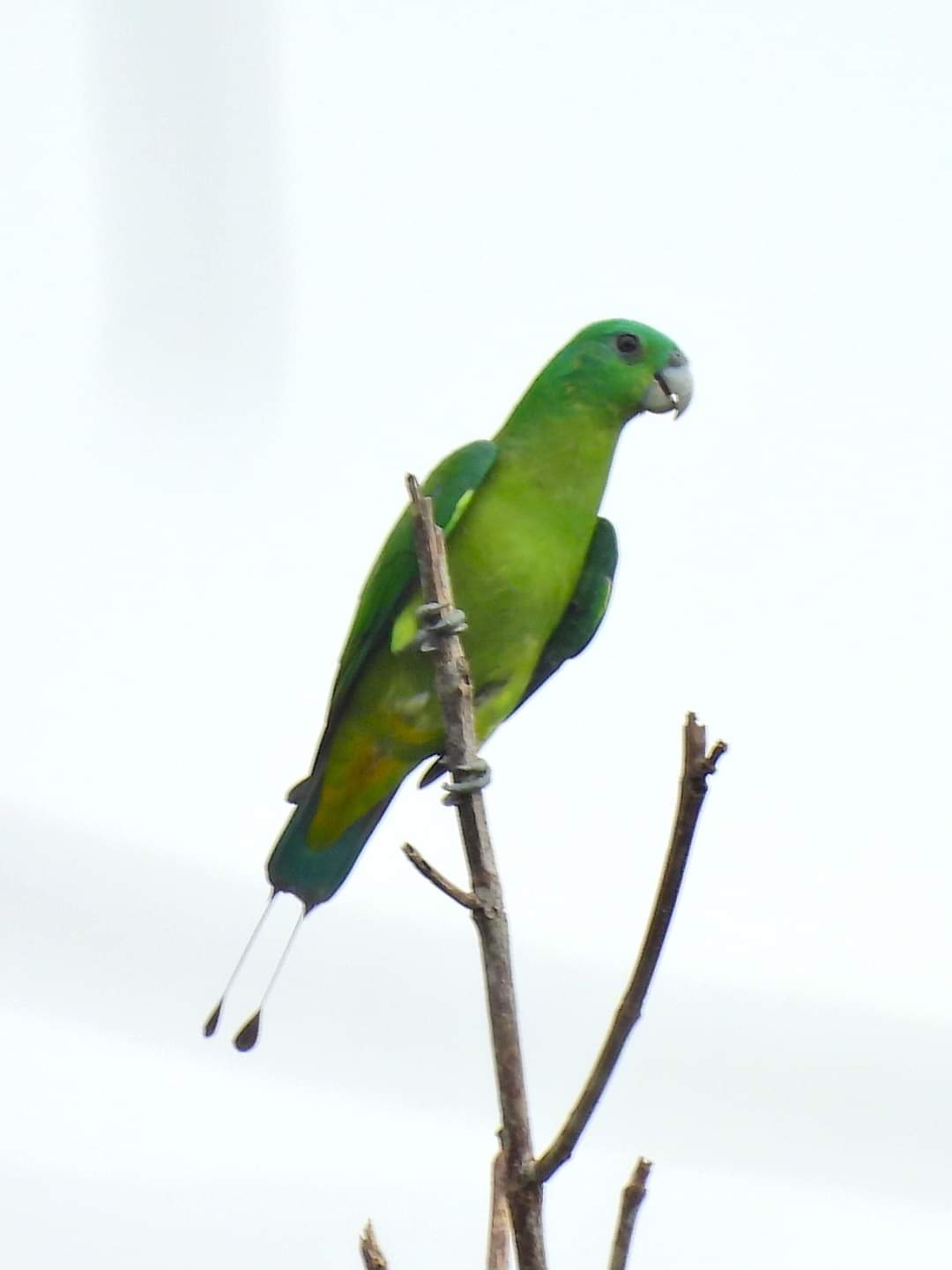
- Female

Conservation status
- Vulnerable (IUCN 3.1)

Scientific classification
- Kingdom: Animalia
- Phylum: Chordata
- Class: Aves
- Order: Psittaciformes
- Family: Psittaculidae
- Genus: Prioniturus
- Species: P. platenae

Binomial name
- Prioniturus platenae Blasius, 1888

= Blue-headed racket-tail =

Species of bird

The blue-headed racket-tail (Prioniturus platenae), also known as the Palawan racket-tail and locally as kinawihan, is a parrot found in the western Philippines around Palawan. The species was formerly considered conspecific with the blue-crowned racket-tail. It is locally known as 'kilit'. It inhabits humid lowland forest in small flocks. It is threatened by habitat destruction and limited trapping for the cage-bird trade.

== Description and taxonomy ==
The blue-headed racket-tail is 27–28 cm long. The plumage is green with a bright, light blue head, blue underwings (except for green coverts) and, in the male, a bluish breast. The beak is bluish gray and iris is yellowish. The species utters a variety of raucous squawks with the occasional musical phrase.

Ebird describes this bird as "A medium-sized parrot of lowland forest and edge on Palawan and neighboring islands. The two central tail feathers have extended shafts ending in a racket shape. Overall green in color, darker on the back and paler below, with yellow under the base of the tail. Male has extensive blue on the head, which is reduced in the female. Note the pale cream-colored bill. Occurs together with Blue-naped parrot, but lacks the red bill. Voice includes various grating calls and shrill squeals."

== Ecology and behavior ==
Little is known about this parrot. It is seen in pairs or small flocks, and tends to be very noisy in flight but more silent while feeding. The species feeds on a wide variety of nuts and fruits. It feeds regularly in banana plantations, resulting in some persecution as a pest.

Like all other racket-tails, they nest in tree cavities. Thus, they are reliant on larger trees to be able to breed.

== Habitat and conservation status ==
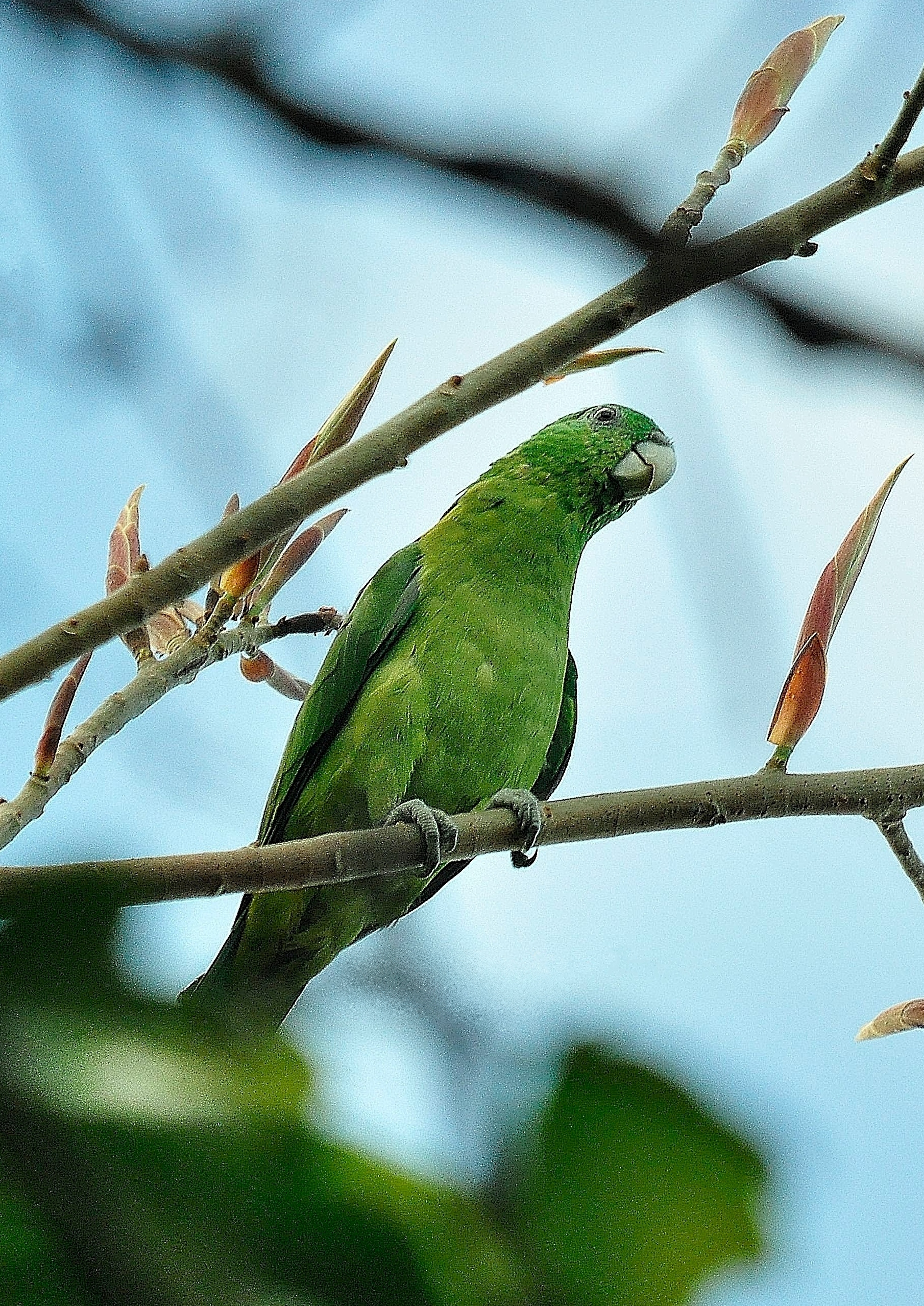
A Blue-headed Racket-tail seen in Coron

The species is endemic to the islands of Palawan, Balabac Island, Dumaran Island, Linapacan, Culion, and Busuanga Island.It inhabits lowland forest and adjacent cultivated areas, and occasionally scrubland and mangroves, at altitudes of up to at least 650 m.

The species is currently classified as Vulnerable by the IUCN, and has been since 1994. The population has been estimated at 1,500 to 7,00 mature individuals with the population believed to be on the decline.

Deforestation is considered the worst threat. On Palawan, deforestation has been rapid due to large mining and logging operations. Mining for chromite on Palawan (and surrounding islands) has contributed majorly to habitat destruction in the area. Illegal logging seems to prevalent in southern Palawan, further putting the blue-headed racket-tail at risk. Capture for the illegal exotic pet trade has a minor impact, as it is usually only captured and sold locally, with very few shipments going out of the Palawan area. Most of the time, the birds die quickly in captivity.

The species is present in conservation areas, since the entirety of Palawan is technically a game reserve where hunting is illegal (however this still occurs), and there are populations in several other protected areas. Awareness campaigns and festivals have been initiated by the Katala Foundation.

Conservation actions proposed include surveys in remaining lowland forests throughout its rangem. Seek greater control of the cage-bird trade. Support the proposed extension of Puerto Princesa Subterranean River National Park. Clamp down on illegal logging and ensure the environmental impacts of proposed mining operations are properly assessed and damage is mitigated for. Assess the damage it causes to crops and tackle the threat of persecution by developing of alternative mitigation measures for farmers. Carry out awareness campaigns regarding the protected status of the species
