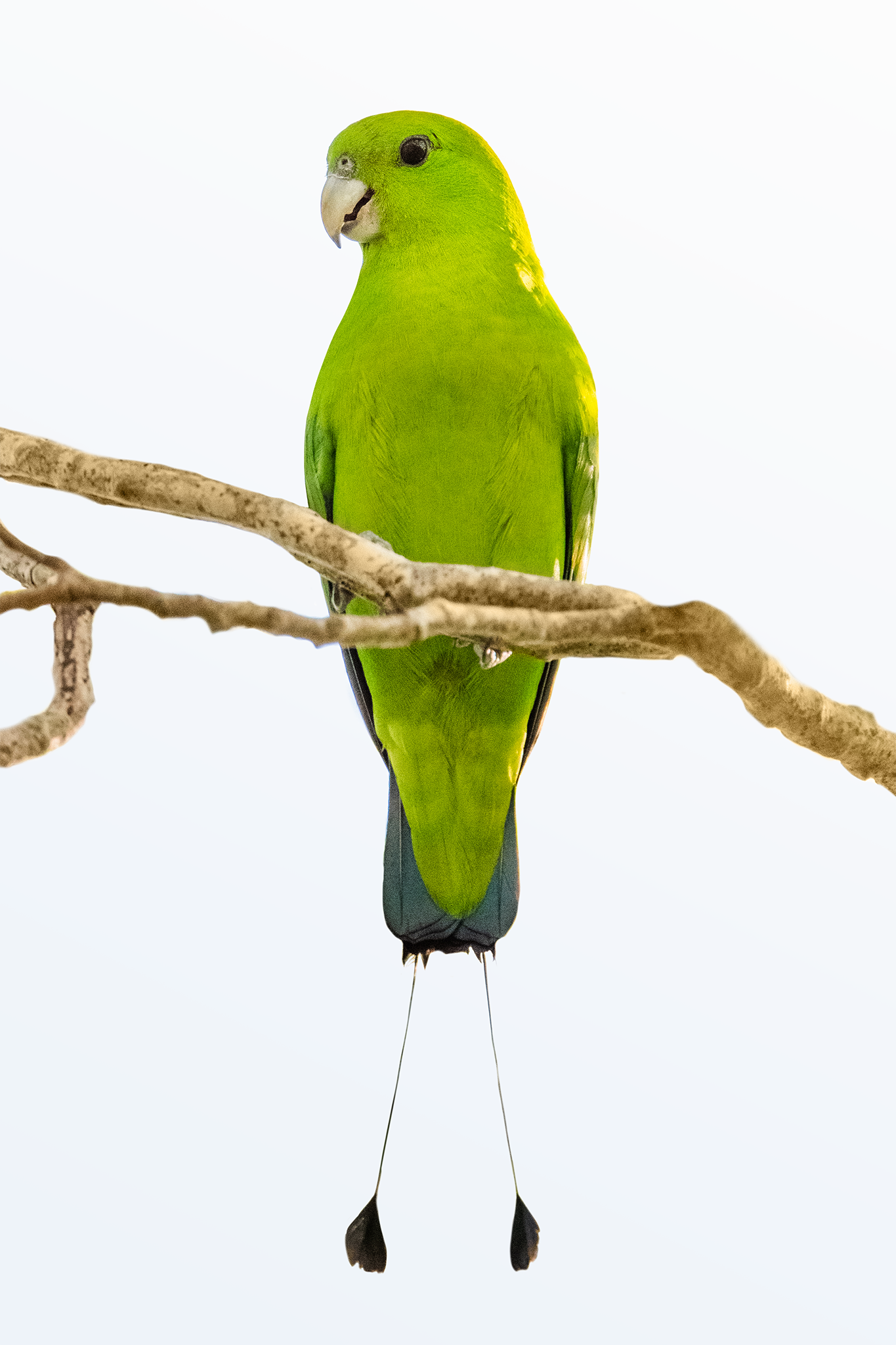
- Male

Conservation status
- Endangered (IUCN 3.1)

Scientific classification
- Kingdom: Animalia
- Phylum: Chordata
- Class: Aves
- Order: Psittaciformes
- Family: Psittaculidae
- Genus: Prioniturus
- Species: P. luconensis

Binomial name
- Prioniturus luconensis Steere, 1890

= Green racket-tail =

Species of bird

The green racket-tail (Prioniturus luconensis) is an endemic parrot of the Philippines where it is found on Luzon and Marinduque. This species was once common, but is rapidly declining and is currently classified as endangered due to lowland deforestation and capture for cage-bird trade. The population is now estimated to be just 300 - 800 mature individuals and is continuing to decline with many local extinctions in its former range.

It is illegal to hunt, capture, or keep Green racket-tails and any other wild bird in the Philippines under Philippine Law RA 9147.

== Description and taxonomy ==
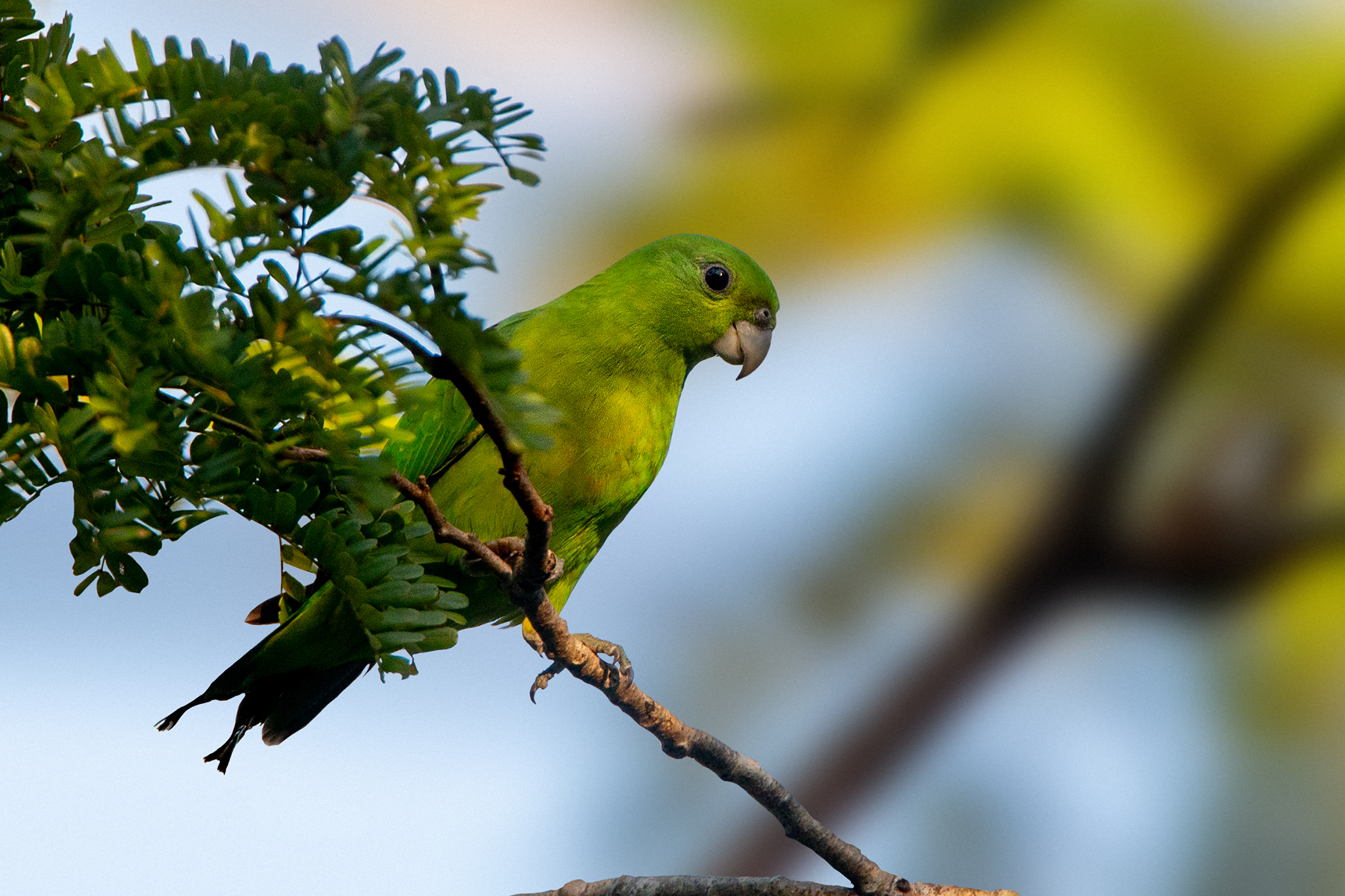
Juvenile Green Racket-tail

This is a species of an all green parrot found only in the lowland forests of Luzon. The tail has two central tail feathers that end with racquets.

They are sexually dimorphic. Males are entirely yellow-green, with paler underparts and head. The two central tail feathers are elongated with bare shafts and terminated with black rackets. Females are generally darker and less yellowish, while the bare tail shafts are shorter. Juveniles do not have rackets at the tail. It is the smallest of all the racquet-tails with a total length of about 29 centimetres (11 in).

This species is monotypic.

== Behaviour and ecology ==
Feeds on fruit, particularly bananas, flowers and seeds of growing corn, and rice.

Like all other Racket-tails, they are cavity nesters. According to poachers, chicks are often poached in the month of May.

== Habitat and conservation status ==
Green racket-tails can be found in the canopy of tropical lowland rainforests in elevations of up to 700 metres (2,300 ft) where it mainly prefers primary forest but is also seen in secondary forest and forest. They have also been recorded visiting cultivations to feed on crops.

It is listed as Endangered with the population estimated at 300 - 800 mature individuals remaining, as of 2024. It has gone locally extinct in many of its former sites and is feared extinct on Marinduque. Its main threat is trapping for the cage-bird trade. Local extinctions as a direct result of forest loss are very likely. In 1988, forest cover was just 3% on Marinduque and 24% on Luzon with the remaining forest continuing to be threatened by both legal and illegal logging. mining, road construction, slash-and-burn or kaingin.

In its stronghold in Subic has experienced increased illegal logging and deforestation continues in Maria Aurora Memorial Natural Park. Interspecific competition is also a threat as they have been replaced by the commoner Blue-crowned racket-tail in Quezon National Forest Park.

It is currently known from two protected areas Bataan National Park and the Northern Sierra Madre Natural Park. It receives nominal protection in the Maria Aurora Memorial Natural Park. However, like most areas in the Philippines protection and enforcement is lax and deforestation and the cage-bird trade continue.

Conservation actions proposed include surveys to identify further sites supporting key populations, with a view to formally establishing them as protected areas. Research its ecology and year-round requirements, to improve understanding of its management needs. Examine trends in Racket-tail species at all sites to monitor the spread of the apparently invasive Blue-crowned racket-tail. Improve protection measures against logging at Subic Bay Forest Reserve. Clamp down on illegal logging within the species's range, and ensure that environmental impact assessments are carried out before any new logging concessions are granted. Establish a captive breeding population to support future reintroduction and supplementation efforts. Lobby against proposed developments that threaten suitable habitat.
