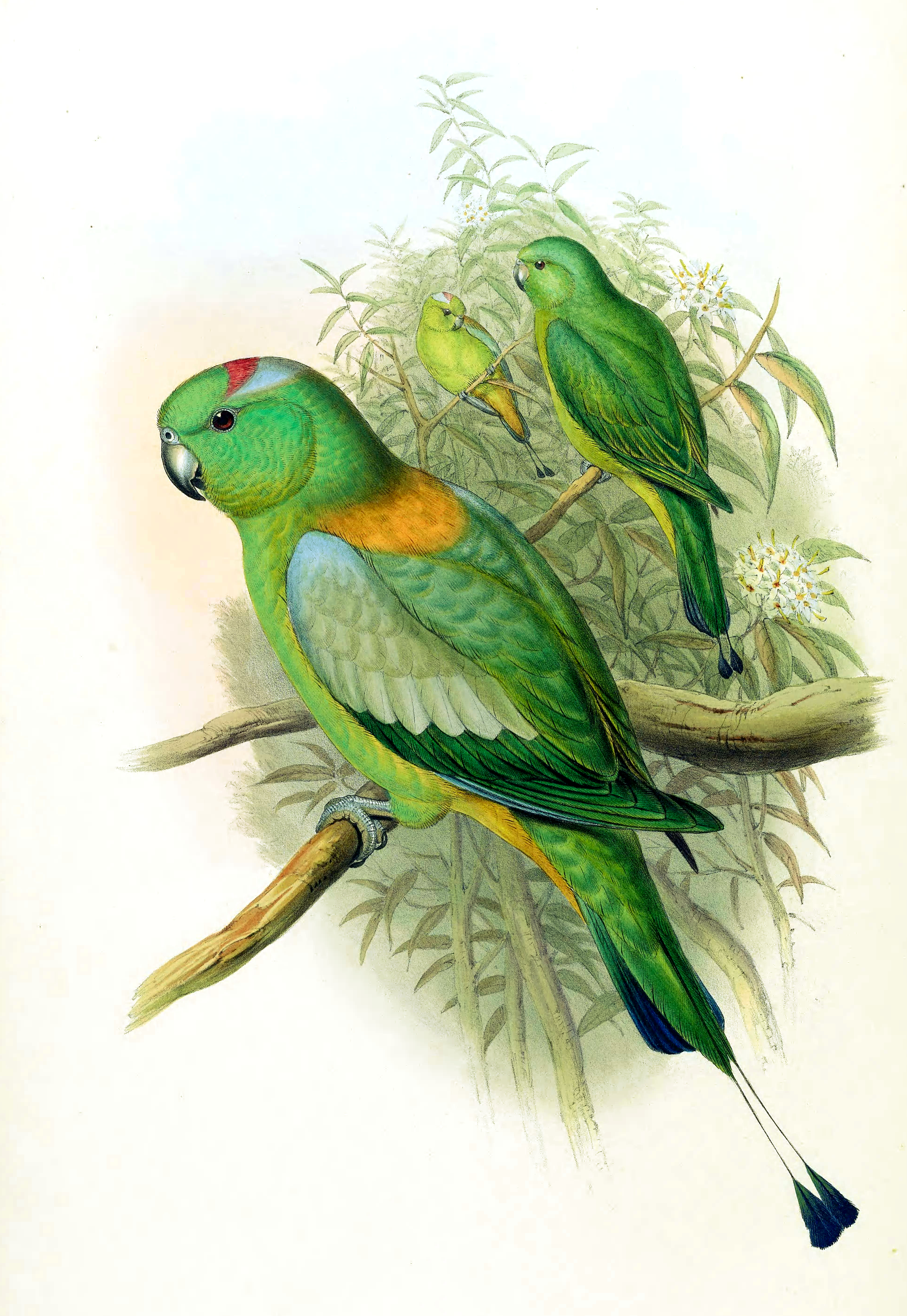

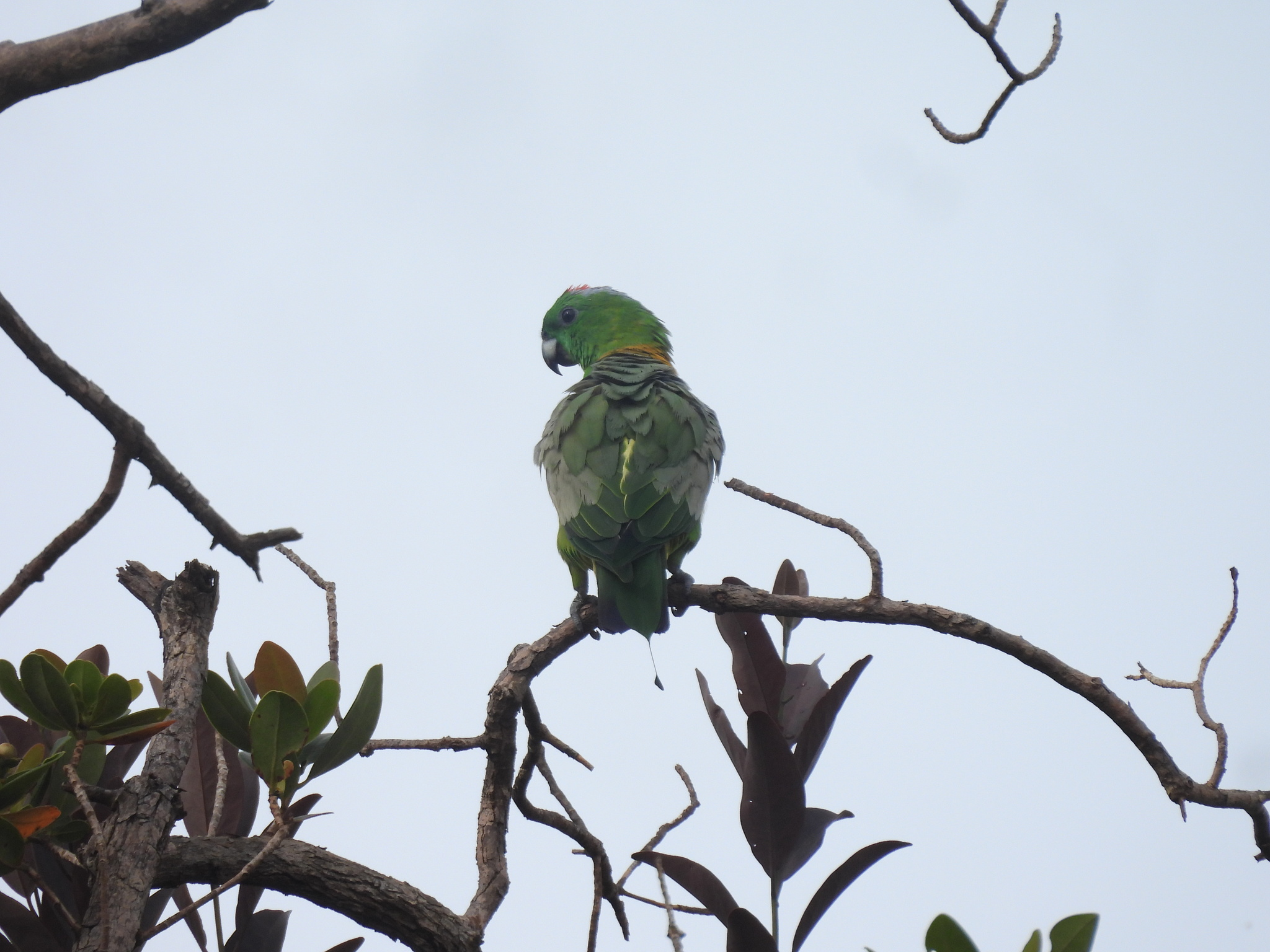

Conservation status
- Least Concern (IUCN 3.1)

Scientific classification
- Kingdom: Animalia
- Phylum: Chordata
- Class: Aves
- Order: Psittaciformes
- Family: Psittaculidae
- Genus: Prioniturus
- Species: P. platurus

Binomial name
- Prioniturus platurus (Vieillot, 1818)

= Golden-mantled racket-tail =

Species of parrot

Golden-mantled Racquet-tail in Sulawesi

The golden-mantled racket-tail (Prioniturus platurus) is a species of parrot in the family Psittaculidae. It is endemic to Indonesia. Its natural habitats are subtropical or tropical moist lowland forest and subtropical or tropical moist montane forest up to an altitude of about 3,000 metres (9,800 ft).

== Subspecies ==
Three subspecies are recognised. The nominate subspecies P. p. platurus occurs in Sulawesi, Togian, Banggai and several other nearby islands, P. p. talautensis occurs in the Talaud Islands and P. p. sinerubris occurs in Taliabu and Mangole in the Sula Islands. One of the places where this bird can be seen is the Gunung Ambang Nature Reserve on Sulawesi.

== Description ==
Adult golden-mantled racket-tails are about 28 cm (11 in) long and weigh about 220 g (8 oz). The male is mainly green with a rose red spot surrounded by a grey blotch above the eye and an orange collar across the mantle. The underparts are pale green. The upper wing coverts are grey and the secondaries greenish-blue with yellowish inner margins. The central tail feathers are green near the base but elongated into "rackets", with bare shafts and black tips tinged with blue. The outer tail feathers are green with a black band near the tip. The female is similar but lacks the red spot and the orange collar, has greener upper wing coverts and has a shorter tail. The juvenile is similar to the female but does not have bare shafts to the tail feathers. The bill is grey and the iris dark brown.

The call consists of various whistling notes which are slurred together making a musical whole. Other sounds emitted are harsh and guttural.

== Behaviour ==
The golden-mantled racket-tail often forms small flocks. The diet consists of seeds and fruit found in the forest and the bird sometimes visits mango plantations to feed. Breeding takes place in October and holes in trees are used as nesting sites.

== Status ==
The golden-mantled racket-tail has a wide range and is common within much of that range and the IUCN has classified the bird as being of "least concern".
