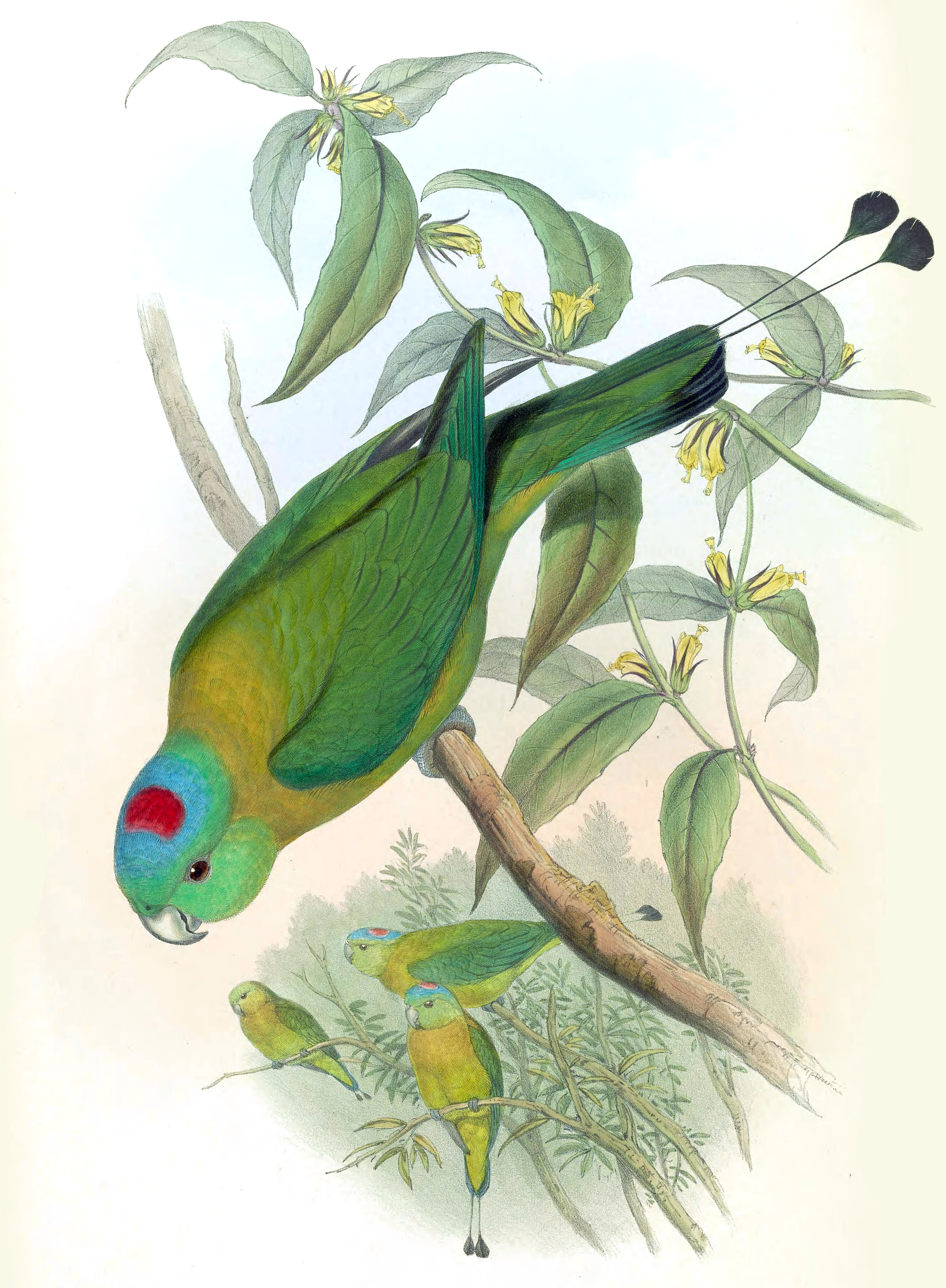

Conservation status
- Near Threatened (IUCN 3.1)

Scientific classification
- Kingdom: Animalia
- Phylum: Chordata
- Class: Aves
- Order: Psittaciformes
- Family: Psittaculidae
- Genus: Prioniturus
- Species: P. flavicans

Binomial name
- Prioniturus flavicans Cassin, 1853

= Yellow-breasted racket-tail =

Species of bird

The yellow-breasted racket-tail (Prioniturus flavicans) is a species of parrot in the family Psittaculidae. It is endemic to Indonesia where it is native to the Minahasa Peninsula and the Togian Islands in the Gulf of Tomini. Its natural habitat is subtropical or tropical moist lowland forests.

== Description ==
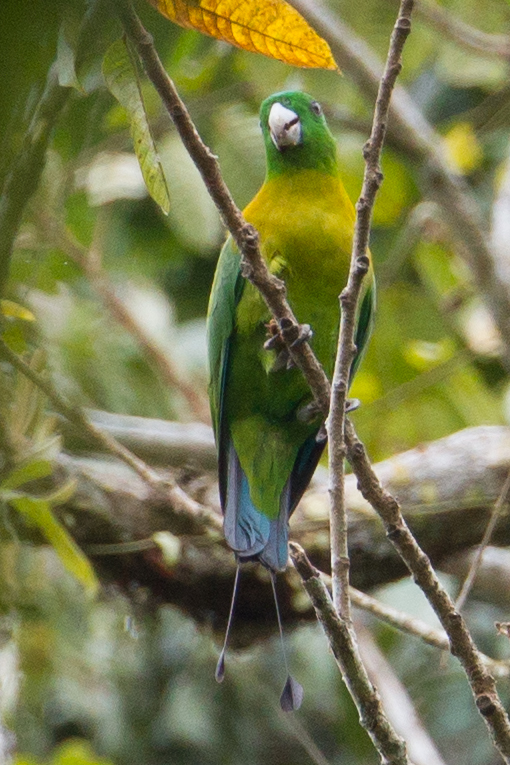
In North Sulawesi

The yellow-breasted racket-tail has an olive-green back, neck and chest. The bill is pale grey and its irises are brown. Its legs are grey. Males are blue on the top of the head with a red area on the crown. The tail feather are green with terminal black spatulas. Females have a smaller area of blue on the head and no red. Juveniles are similar to females, but have less blue on the head.

== Distribution ==
Prioniturus flavicans is mainly found on the northern peninsula of the island of Sulawesi (along with other smaller nearby islands such as Bangka Island) and the Togian Islands. This bird's natural range only exists the country of Indonesia.

== Ecology & Behavior ==
Prioniturus flavicans is a quiet and modest bird that is often found in pairs or small flocks. To avoid being noticed by predators, this bird prefers to stay in the upper canopy of trees and moves cautiously among the branches.

== Threats ==
Like most other birds in Indonesia, the yellow-breasted racket-tail is threatened by heavy deforestation to make may for plantations (especially palm oil), mining operations, and logging. Because of these threats, this bird is listed as a near-threatened species by the IUCN.
