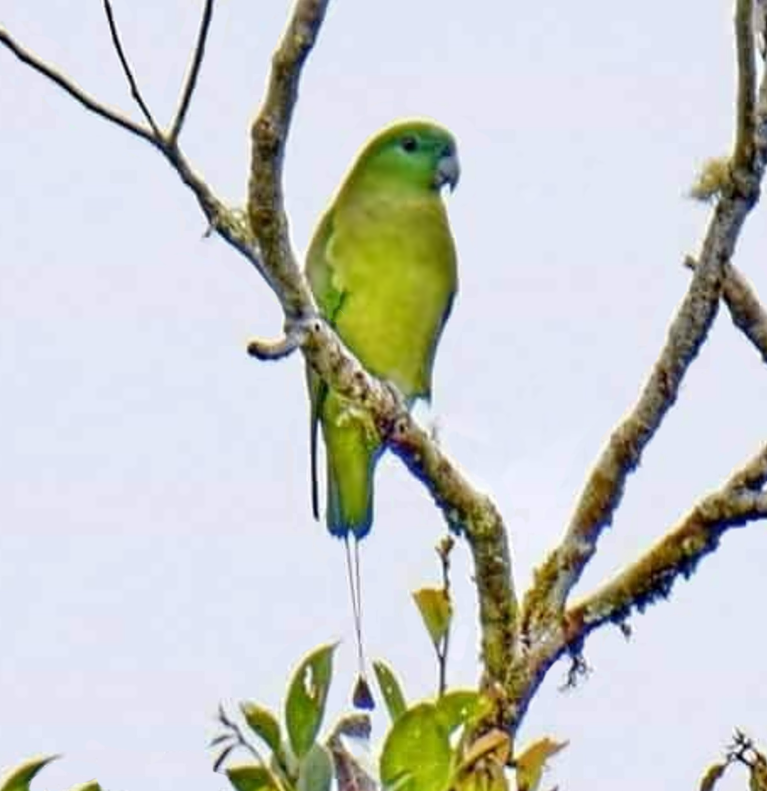

Conservation status
- Near Threatened (IUCN 3.1)

Scientific classification
- Kingdom: Animalia
- Phylum: Chordata
- Class: Aves
- Order: Psittaciformes
- Family: Psittaculidae
- Genus: Prioniturus
- Species: P. waterstradti

Binomial name
- Prioniturus waterstradti Rothschild, 1904

= Mindanao racket-tail =

Species of bird

The Mindanao racket-tail (Prioniturus waterstradti) is a species of parrot in the family Psittaculidae. It is endemic to Mindanao in the Philippines. It was previously conspecific with the Luzon Racket-tail. Two subspecies are recognized: the nominate waterstradti in the south-east, and malindangensis in the west. Its natural habitat is tropical moist montane forests. The species is considered "Near Threatened" due to habitat loss and trapping for the pet trade.

== Description and taxonomy ==
=== Subspecies ===
Two subspecies are recognized

- P. w. waterstradti – Found in the south-east Mindanao; browner mantle
- P. w. malindangensis – Found in the west Mindanao; paler blue on crown and face

== Ecology and behavior ==
This species has no studies on its diet and breeding. It is presumed to follow a typical racquet tail diet that includes berries, seeds, and nuts. Like all other racket-tails, they are cavity nesters. Not much else is known about its breeding habits and diet.

== Habitat and conservation status ==
It inhabits tropic moist montane forest at 820–2,700 m, but it has been recorded as low as 450 m.

IUCN has assessed this bird as near threatened with its population being estimated as 3,300 mature individuals. Despite this fairly low number and limited range, it is said to be locally common in its range. Montane forest is less under threat than lowland forest. Forest loss may represent a threat but it is not thought to have a significant impact within this species's alititudinal range. Many parrots in the region are affected by trapping for trade, but its impacts upon this species are not known.

It is recommended to gather data on the impacts of international and national trade. Undergo surveys to have a better population estimate. Calculate rates of forest loss within its altitudinal and geographic range using satellite imagery and remote sensing techniques. Effectively protect habitat at key sites,
