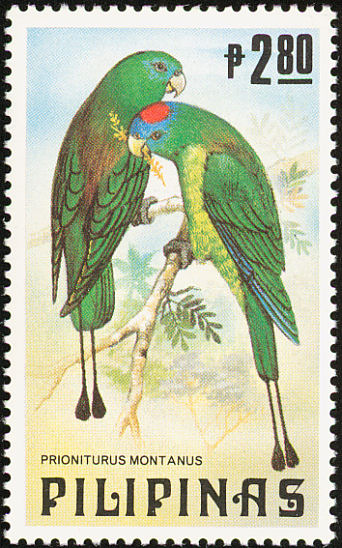
- A 1984 Philippine stamp featuring this species
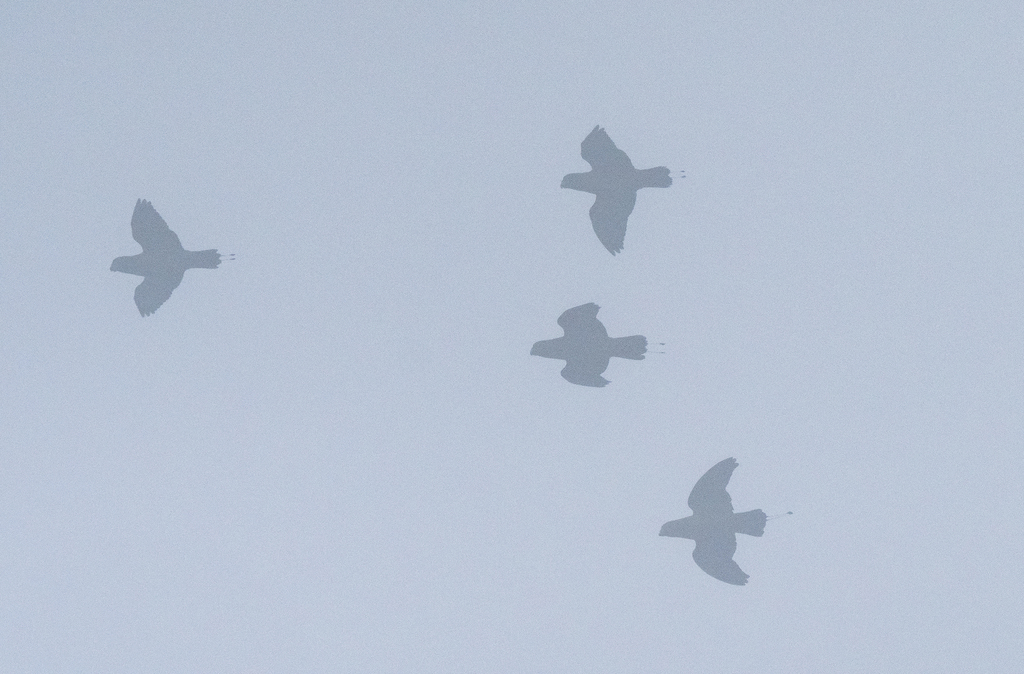
- A flock of Montane racket-tails in flight in fog

Conservation status
- Near Threatened (IUCN 3.1)

Scientific classification
- Kingdom: Animalia
- Phylum: Chordata
- Class: Aves
- Order: Psittaciformes
- Family: Psittaculidae
- Genus: Prioniturus
- Species: P. montanus

Binomial name
- Prioniturus montanus Ogilvie-Grant, 1895

= Montane racket-tail =

Species of bird

The montane racket-tail (Prioniturus montanus), also known as the Luzon racket-tail, is a species of parrot in the family Psittaculidae. It was previously considered conspecific with the Mindanao racket-tail. This bird is endemic to the mountainous regions of northern Luzon, Philippines. It faces threats from habitat loss and the cage bird trade.

Under Philippine Law RA 9147, it is illegal to hunt, capture, or possess this species.

== Description and taxonomy ==
The species exhibits sexual dimorphism, with males having a bluish crown and a bright red spot, while females have a green head with a very light blue tinge.

== Ecology and behavior ==
It feeds on berries, seeds, and nuts. Breeding takes place from August to September. Like all other racket-tails, they are cavity nesters.

== Habitat and conservation status ==
It inhabits tropical moist Montane Forests at elevations of 700–2,900 meters above sea level and is known to visit cultivated areas.

The IUCN has assessed this bird as near threatened, with its population estimated at 1,500 to 7,000 mature individuals. Forest loss is a threat, though it is not considered to have as significant an impact within this species' altitudinal range compared to lowland forests. Its lowland counterpart, the Green racket-tail, is much more threatened, being listed as endangered with many local extinctions. While many parrots in the region are affected by trapping for trade, the impact on this species is not well known.
