= List of parrots =

Parrots, also known as psittacines (/ˈsɪtəkaɪnz/), are the 402 species of birds that make up the order Psittaciformes, found in most tropical and subtropical regions, of which 387 are extant. The order is subdivided into three superfamilies; the Psittacoidea ("true" parrots), the Cacatuoidea (cockatoos), and the Strigopoidea (New Zealand parrots). Parrots have a generally pantropical distribution with several species inhabiting temperate regions in both the Northern and Southern Hemispheres as well. The greatest diversity of parrots is in South America and Australasia.

The Cacatuoidea are distinct from the rest of the order in having a movable head crest, a different arrangement of the carotid arteries, a gall bladder, differences in the skull bones, and in lacking the Dyck texture feathers that, in the Psittacoidea, scatter light to produce the vibrant colours of so many parrots. The Lorikeets were previously regarded as a family, Loriidae, but are now considered a tribe (Loriini) within the subfamily Loriinae, family Psittaculidae. Some species, such as the Puerto Rican amazon (Amazona vittata) have had a population bottleneck (in this case reduced to 13 individuals in 1975) and subsequently have low genetic variability and low reproductive success, leading to complications with conservation.

No consensus existed regarding the taxonomy of Psittaciformes until recently. The placement of the Strigopoidea species has been variable in the past. They were once considered part of the Psittacoidea, but recent 21st century studies place this group of New Zealand species as their own superfamily next to the Cacatuoidea and remaining members of the Psittacoidea. Many studies have confirmed the unique placement of this group at the base of the parrot tree. Most authors now accept this group as a separate taxon containing a single family Strigopidae, though some split this into two families, Nestoridae and Strigopidae. Conversely, the relationships among various cockatoo genera are largely resolved.

== Conventions ==
IUCN Red List categories
Conservation status
- EX: Extinct (15 species)
- EW: Extinct in the wild (1 species)
- CR: Critically endangered (17 species)
- EN: Endangered (38 species)
- VU: Vulnerable (54 species)
- NT: Near threatened (59 species)
- LC: Least concern (219 species)

Other categories
- DD: Data deficient (0 species)
- NE: Not evaluated (5 species)

Conservation status codes listed follow the International Union for Conservation of Nature (IUCN) Red List of Threatened Species. Range maps are provided wherever possible; if a range map is not available, a description of the bird's range is provided. Ranges are based on the IUCN red list for that species unless otherwise noted. The extinct species listed became extinct after 1500 CE (recently extinct), and are indicated by a dagger symbol "†".

== Classification ==
The order Psittaciformes consists of 387 extant species belonging to 87 genera. The following classification is based on the most recent proposals as of 2012, with some updates to match the AviList.

Superfamily Strigopoidea: New Zealand parrots

- Family Strigopidae: three genera with three living (the flightless, critically endangered kākāpō, the kea and the New Zealand kaka), and several extinct species in the New Zealand region

Superfamily Cacatuoidea: cockatoos

- Family Cacatuidae
  - Subfamily Nymphicinae: one genus with one species, the cockatiel
  - Subfamily Calyptorhynchinae: the black cockatoos
  - Subfamily Cacatuinae
    - Tribe Microglossini: one genus with one species, the black palm cockatoo
    - Tribe Cacatuini: four genera of white, pink, and grey species

Superfamily Psittacoidea: true parrots

- Family Psittacidae
  - Subfamily Psittacinae: two African genera, Psittacus and Poicephalus
  - Subfamily Arinae
    - Tribe Arini: eighteen genera
    - Tribe Androglossini: seven genera
- Family Psittaculidae
  - Subfamily Psittrichasinae: one species, Pesquet's parrot
  - Subfamily Coracopsinae: one genus with several species
  - Subfamily Platycercinae
    - Tribe Pezoporini: ground parrots and allies
    - Tribe Platycercini: broad-tailed parrots
  - Subfamily Psittacellinae: one genus (Psittacella) with several species
  - Subfamily Loriinae
    - Tribe Loriini: lories and lorikeets
    - Tribe Melopsittacini: one genus with one species, the budgerigar
    - Tribe Cyclopsittini: fig parrots
  - Subfamily Agapornithinae: three genera
  - Subfamily Psittaculinae
    - Tribe Polytelini: three genera
    - Tribe Psittaculini: Asian psittacines
    - Tribe Micropsittini: pygmy parrots

== New Zealand parrots ==
=== Family Strigopidae ===
Genus Strigops Gray, 1845 – one species
Common name	Scientific name	IUCN Red List Status	Range	Picture
Kākāpō	S. habroptilus Gray, 1845	CR^{IUCN}	Codfish Island / Whenua Hou, Anchor Island, and Little Barrier Island	A stocky, green parrot with black spots on the back and a straw-coloured faced

Genus Nestor Lesson, 1830 – three species
Common name	Scientific name	IUCN Red List Status	Range	Picture
New Zealand kākā	N. meridionalis (Gmelin, 1788)	eEN^{IUCN}	Scattered populations across New Zealand	A light brown-grey parrot with maroon spots on the underside and orange cheeks
Norfolk kākā	†N. productus (Gould, 1836)	aEX^{IUCN}	Formerly Norfolk Island and Phillip Island until 1851	A brown parrot with orange-and-red cheeks and underside
Kea	N. notabilis Gould, 1856	gVU^{IUCN}	Scattered populations across the South Island	A green parrot with a light-brown head and a brown-green underside

== Cockatoos ==
=== Family Cacatuidae ===
==== Subfamily Calyptorhynchinae ====
Genus Calyptorhynchus Desmarest, 1826 – two species
Common name	Scientific name	IUCN Red List Status	Range	Picture
Red-tailed black cockatoo	C. banksii (Latham, 1790)	LC^{IUCN}	West Western Australia, northern North Australia, and eastern Australia except Victoria	A black parrot with a crest and males have small, white spots on their head and neck
Glossy black cockatoo	C. lathami (Temminck, 1807)	VU^{IUCN}	=Eastern coast of Australia except Queensland	Male left, female right

Genus Zanda Mathews, 1913 – three species
Common name	Scientific name	IUCN Red List Status	Range	Picture
Baudin's black cockatoo	Z. baudinii (Lear, 1832)	eCR^{IUCN}	Southwestern tip of Australia	A brown parrot with a crest, and a white back-of-the-neck and beak
Yellow-tailed black cockatoo	Z. funerea (Shaw, 1794)	LC^{IUCN}	Z. f. funereus in red, Z. f. xanthanotus in green	A brown parrot with a crest and white cheeks
Carnaby's black cockatoo	Z. latirostris (Carnaby, 1948)	eEN^{IUCN}	Southwestern tip of Australia	A brown parrot with a crest, and white cheeks and beak

==== Subfamily Nymphicinae ====
Genus Nymphicus Wagler, 1832 – one species
Common name	Scientific name	IUCN Red List Status	Range	Picture
Cockatiel	N. hollandicus (Kerr, 1792)	LC^{IUCN}	Australia, excluding the coast	Male left, female right

==== Subfamily Cacatuinae ====
Tribe Microglossini

Genus Probosciger Kuhl, 1820 – one species
Common name	Scientific name	IUCN Red List Status	Range	Picture
Palm cockatoo	P. aterrimus (Gmelin, 1788)	NT^{IUCN}	New Guinea excluding the New Guinea Highlands	A black parrot with a crest, and a red face

Tribe Cacatuini

Genus Callocephalon Lesson, 1837 – one species
Common name	Scientific name	IUCN Red List Status	Range	Picture
Gang-gang cockatoo	C. fimbriatum (Grant, 1803)	VU^{IUCN}	Southern coast of Victoria	A grey parrot with a red head and crest

Genus Eolophus Bonaparte, 1854 – one species
Common name	Scientific name	IUCN Red List Status	Range	Picture
Galah	E. roseicapilla (Vieillot, 1817)	LC^{IUCN}	Most of Australia	A grey parrot with a pink underside and throat, and a white forehead

Genus Cacatua Vieillot, 1817 – 12 species
Common name	Scientific name	IUCN Red List Status	Range	Picture
White cockatoo	C. alba (Müller, 1776)	eEN^{IUCN}	North Maluku	A white parrot with a crest and a grey beak
Solomons cockatoo	C. ducorpsii Pucheran, 1853	LC^{IUCN}	Solomon Islands	A white parrot with a crest
Sulphur-crested cockatoo	C. galerita (Latham, 1790)	LC^{IUCN}	Native range in red, introduced range in violet	A white parrot with a grey beak and a yellow crest
Tanimbar corella	C. goffiniana Roselaar and Michels, 2004	iNT^{IUCN}	Yamdena and Larat of the Tanimbar Islands, and introduced to the Kai Islands	A white parrot with a crest and a grey beak
Red-vented cockatoo	C. haematuropygia (Müller, 1776)	CR^{IUCN}	The Philippines	A white parrot with a crest
Pink cockatoo	C. leadbeateri (Vigors, 1831)	LC^{IUCN}	Australia excluding the coast	A white parrot with a pink head and underside, a red crest, a grey beak, and white eye-spots
Salmon-crested cockatoo	C. moluccensis (Gmelin, 1788)	gVU^{IUCN}	Seram, Ambon Island, Saparua and Haruku Island	A pink parrot with yellow wings, a red crest, and white eye-spots
Blue-eyed cockatoo	C. ophthalmica Sclater, 1864	gVU^{IUCN}	New Britain and New Ireland	A white parrot with a crest, a grey beak, and blue eye-spots
Western corella	C. pastinator (Gould, 1841)	LC^{IUCN}	Southwest Australian coast	A white parrot with a crest, a yellow tail, a grey beak, and blue eye-spots and feet
Little corella	C. sanguinea Gould, 1843	LC^{IUCN}	Australia, excluding Cape York Peninsula and west central Australia, and introduced to Tasmania	A white parrot with a crest and grey eye-spots
Yellow-crested cockatoo	C. sulphurea (Gmelin, 1788)	CR^{IUCN}	Native range in blue, introduced range in red	A white parrot with a crest, a black beak and a yellow crest
Long-billed corella	C. tenuirostris (Kuhl, 1820)	LC^{IUCN}	New South Wales, excluding the eastern coast	A white parrot with a crest and a red mask

== True parrots ==
=== Family Psittacidae ===
==== Subfamily Psittacinae ====
Genus Psittacus (grey parrots) Linnaeus, 1758 – two species
Common name	Scientific name	IUCN Red List Status	Range	Picture
Grey parrot	P. erithacus Linnaeus, 1758	eEN^{IUCN}	Range includes southern regions of Ghana, Nigeria and Cameroon, and throughout Equatorial Guinea, Gabon, Republic of the Congo and Democratic Republic of the Congo.	A grey parrot with black beak, white face and a short red tail
Timneh parrot	P. timneh Fraser, 1844	eEN^{IUCN}	Range is from Guinea-Bissau east through southern Guinea, Sierra Leone, and Liberia east to at least 70 km east of the Bandama River in Côte d'Ivoire.	A grey parrot with a white mask. The dark bill has a lighter colouring on the upper mandible.

Genus Poicephalus Swainson, 1837 – ten species
Common name	Scientific name	IUCN Red List Status	Range	Picture
Senegal parrot	P. senegalus (Linnaeus, 1766)	LC^{IUCN}	West Africa (excluding the Maghreb)	A parrot with a yellow underbelly, green upper chest and grey head
Red-bellied parrot	P. rufiventris (Rüppell, 1842)	LC^{IUCN}	Eastern Horn of Africa, eastern Kenya, and northeast Tanzania	Two parrots with grey heads. One has an orange-red belly, the other is green.
Rüppell's parrot	P. rueppellii (G. R. Gray, 1849)	LC^{IUCN}	Northern Namibia and the coast of Angola	A grey parrot with blue belly and yellow legs. The top of the wings near the shoulders is almost white.
Brown-necked parrot	P. fuscicollis (Kuhl, 1820)	LC^{IUCN}	From Gambia and southern Senegal to Ghana and Togo	Two parrots with a grey head, grey neck, white bill and dark green wings perching.
Cape parrot	P. robustus (Gmelin, 1788)	gVU^{IUCN}	Range includes: Angola; Botswana; Burundi; Cameroon; Democratic Republic of the Congo; Côte d'Ivoire; Gambia; Ghana; Guinea; Guinea-Bissau; Liberia; Malawi; Mozambique; Namibia; Nigeria; Rwanda; South Africa; Swaziland; Tanzania; Togo; Uganda; Zambia; Zimbabwe.	A parrot with a brown head, brown neck and white bill is peering out of a hole in a tree.
Meyer's parrot	P. meyeri (Cretzschmar, 1827)	LC^{IUCN}	Range includes Angola; Botswana; Burundi; Cameroon; Central African Republic; Chad; Democratic Republic of the Congo; Eritrea; Ethiopia; Kenya; Malawi; Mozambique; Namibia; Rwanda; South Africa; South Sudan; Sudan; Tanzania; Uganda; Zambia; Zimbabwe.	Two brown parrots. Their underplumage is turquoise-green.
Red-fronted parrot	P. gulielmi (Jardine, 1849)	LC^{IUCN}	Range includes Angola; Cameroon; Central African Republic; Congo; Democratic Republic of the Congo; Côte d'Ivoire; Equatorial Guinea; Gabon; Ghana; Kenya; Liberia; Nigeria; Tanzania; Uganda.	A green parrot with an orange-yellow forehead.
Yellow-fronted parrot	P. flavifrons (Rüppell, 1842)	LC^{IUCN}	Western Ethiopia	A green parrot with a yellow face
Brown-headed parrot	P. cryptoxanthus (Peters, 1854)	LC^{IUCN}	Southeast African coast	A green parrot with a light-brown head
Niam-Niam parrot	P. crassus (Sharpe, 1884)	LC^{IUCN}	Central Central African Republic	

==== Subfamily Arinae (neotropical parrots) ====
Tribe Arini

Genus Cyanoliseus Bonaparte, 1854 – one species
Common name	Scientific name	IUCN Red List Status	Range	Picture
Burrowing parrot	C. patagonus (Vieillot, 1818)	LC^{IUCN}	Central Argentina stretching to the coasts	A green parrot with a black breast and a white eye-spot

Genus Enicognathus G. R. Gray, 1840 – two species
Common name	Scientific name	IUCN Red List Status	Range	Picture
Slender-billed parakeet	E. leptorhynchus (King, 1831)	LC^{IUCN}	Central Chilean coast (central meaning halfway between the northern and southern extremes)	A green parrot with sea-green wings and a red tail
Austral parakeet	E. ferrugineus (Müller, 1776)	LC^{IUCN}	Eastern Patagonian coast, southern Tierra del Fuego, the Falkland Islands, South Sandwich Islands and South Georgia	A yellow-green parrot with green wings and orange underside

Genus Rhynchopsitta (thick-billed parrots) Bonaparte, 1854 – two species
Common name	Scientific name	IUCN Red List Status	Range	Picture
Thick-billed parrot	R. pachyrhyncha (Swainson, 1827)	eEN^{IUCN}	Sierra Madre Occidental	A green parrot with a bright red forehead
Maroon-fronted parrot	R. terrisi Moore, 1947	eEN^{IUCN}	Sierra Madre Oriental	A green parrot with a maroon forehead

Genus Pyrrhura Bonaparte, 1856 – 28 species
Common name	Scientific name	IUCN Red List Status	Range	Picture
Ochre-marked parakeet	P. cruentata (Wied-Neuwied, 1820)	gVU^{IUCN}	Scattered populations around the southeastern coast of Brazil (north of São Paulo)	A green parrot with a maroon head and tail
Maroon-bellied parakeet	P. frontalis (Vieillot, 1818)	LC^{IUCN}	Southwest Brazil, northern Uruguay, and southern Paraguay	A green parrot with a maroon underside and tail with a white eye-spot
Blaze-winged parakeet	P. devillei (Massena and de Souancé, 1854)	iNT^{IUCN}	Northern Paraguay and Southwest Brazil along the Brazil/(northern) Paraguay border	
Crimson-bellied parakeet	P. perlata (Spix, 1824)	gVU^{IUCN}	Central Brazil and along the Brazil/Bolivia border	A teal parrot with a yellow cheek, dark-purple forehead, bright red underside, and blue wings
Pearly parakeet	P. lepida (Wagler, 1832)	gVU^{IUCN}	Northeast Brazil south of the Amazon River	A green parrot with a black head and a grey neck with blue-tipped wings
Green-cheeked parakeet	P. molinae (Massena and de Souancé, 1854)	LC^{IUCN}	Central and southern Bolivia extending into northern Argentina	A green parrot with a black head, blue wings, and a red tail with a white eye-spot
Painted parakeet	P. picta (Müller, 1776)	LC^{IUCN}	Northeast South America, north of the Amazon river and east of the Venezuela/Colombia border	A green parrot with a black head and a red tail with a white eye-spot
Sinú parakeet	P. subandina (Todd, 1917)	CR^{IUCN}	Sinú Valley in northern Colombia near (but not bordering) the Gulf of Darién	
Azuero parakeet	P. eisenmanni Delgado, 1985	eEN^{IUCN}	Southwest Azuero Peninsula	A green parrot with a teal forehead and neck, a maroon head, and a black eye-spot
Venezuelan parakeet	P. emma Salvadori, 1891	LC^{IUCN}	Northern coast of Venezuela	A green parrot with a maroon face, tail, and underside with a grey neck, a blue forehead, and a black eye-spot
Santarem parakeet	P. amazonum Hellmayr, 1906	eEN^{IUCN}	Central and southeast Amazon in Brazil	
Madeira parakeet	P. snethlageae Joseph and Bates, 2002	gVU^{IUCN}	Eastern Brazil, west of the Brazil/Bolivia border, south of the Madeira River, and north of the Araguaia River	
Bonaparte's parakeet	P. lucianii (Deville, 1851)	LC^{IUCN}	Northwest Amazon rainforest in Brazil	A green parrot with blue-tipped wings. Males have a red tail and underside with a brown head and neck
Rose-fronted parakeet	P. roseifrons (Gray, 1859)	LC^{IUCN}	Along the Peru/Brazil border and Peru/Bolivia border	A green parrot with a brown head and a red forehead
Wavy-breasted parakeet	P. peruviana Hocking, Blake, and Joseph, 2002	LC^{IUCN}	Along the Marañón river in northern Peru and Ecuador	
White-eared parakeet	P. leucotis (Kuhl, 1820)	gVU^{IUCN}	Southeast Brazilian coast, north of Rio de Janeiro and south of Salvador de Bahia	A green parrot with a maroon face and underside, a white cheek, and a taupe forehead
Grey-breasted parakeet	P. griseipectus Salvadori, 1900	eEN^{IUCN}	Scattered populations in northern Ceará, a state in Brazil	A green parrot with a maroon face and underside, a white cheek, a taupe forehead
Pfrimer's parakeet	P. pfrimeri de Miranda-Ribeiro, 1920	eEN^{IUCN}	Dry forest near the Serra Geral	
Fiery-shouldered parakeet	P. egregia (Sclater, 1881)	LC^{IUCN}	Venezuela west of the Rio Caroni, and Guyana east of the Mazaruni River	A green parrot with a black tail and yellow wings with red shoulders
Santa Marta parakeet	P. viridicata Todd, 1913	eEN^{IUCN}	Sierra Nevada de Santa Marta	A green parrot with blue wings and yellow shoulders
Maroon-tailed parakeet	P. melanura (Spix, 1824)	LC^{IUCN}	Northwest South America, east of the Andes Mountains	A green parrot with a white throat, red shoulders, blue-tipped wings, and a maroon forehead and tail
El Oro parakeet	P. orcesi Ridgely & Robbins, 1988	eEN^{IUCN}	El Oro Province in Ecuador	
Black-capped parakeet	P. rupicola (Tschudi, 1844)	iNT^{IUCN}	Around the Brazil/Peru/Bolivia border within the State of Acre and west of the Andes mountains	A green parrot with a black forehead, underside, and tail with a black-and-white collar
White-breasted parakeet	P. albipectus Chapman, 1914	gVU^{IUCN}	Zamora-Chinchipe Province	A green parrot with a pantone-brown tail and forehead, a peach neck, and red-and-yellow cheeks
Flame-winged parakeet	P. calliptera (Massena and de Souancé, 1854)	gVU^{IUCN}	Andes mountains in Colombia	A green parrot with yellow-tipped wings, a peach throat, a white forehead and eye-spot, and a red tail
Blood-eared parakeet	P. hoematotis de Souancé, 1857	LC^{IUCN}	Northern coast of Venezuela	A green parrot with a red tail, blue-tipped wings, maroon cheeks, a red forehead, and white eye-spots
Rose-crowned parakeet	P. rhodocephala (Sclater and Salvin, 1871)	LC^{IUCN}	Andes mountains in Venezuela, near Lake Maracaibo	A green parrot with a red tail, blue-tipped wings, maroon cheeks, a red forehead, and white eye-spots
Sulphur-winged parakeet	P. hoffmanni (Cabanis, 1861)	LC^{IUCN}	Continental Divide running through Costa Rica and Panama	A green parrot with a red tail, blue-tipped wings, maroon cheeks, a red forehead, and white eye-spots

Genus Anodorhynchus (blue macaws) von Spix, 1824 – three species
Common name	Scientific name	IUCN Red List Status	Range	Picture
Glaucous macaw	A. glaucus (Vieillot, 1816)	CR^{IUCN}	A small population in northeast Argentina near the Argentina/Brazil/Paraguay border	A blue macaw with a pale-blue underside and peach eye-spots
Hyacinth macaw	A. hyacinthinus (Latham, 1790)	gVU^{IUCN}	Central South America around the Bolivia/Brazil/Paraguay border with scattered populations in eastern Brazil	A violet-blue macaw with yellow eye-spots
Lear's macaw	A. leari Bonaparte, 1856	eEN^{IUCN}	two populations in eastern Brazil near the Atlantic Ocean	A blue macaw yellow cheeks and eye-spots

Genus Leptosittaca von Berlepsch and Stolzmann, 1894 – one species
Common name	Scientific name	IUCN Red List Status	Range	Picture
Golden-plumed parakeet	L. branickii von Berlepsch and Stolzmann, 1894	gVU^{IUCN}	Andes mountains in Peru, Colombia, and near the Ecuador/Peru and Ecuador/Colombia borders	A green parrot with a yellow underside and streak on the cheeks, with white eye-spots

Genus Ognorhynchus Bonaparte, 1857 – one species
Common name	Scientific name	IUCN Red List Status	Range	Picture
Yellow-eared parrot	O. icterotis (Massena and de Souancé, 1854)	eEN^{IUCN}	Along the Chocó Department/Antioquia Department border	A green parrot with a yellow forehead and cheeks

Genus Diopsittaca Ridgway, 1912 – two species
Common name	Scientific name	IUCN Red List Status	Range	Picture
Southern red-shouldered macaw	D. cumanensis (Lichtenstein, 1823)	LC^{IUCN}	Brazil, south of the Amazon rainforest	A green parrot with a blue-green forehead, red shoulders, a white beak, a black jaw, and white eye-spots
Northern Red-shouldered Macaw	D. nobilis (Linnaeus, 1758)	LC^{IUCN}	Northern coasts of French Guiana and Suriname, northern Guyana, and eastern Venezuela	A green parrot with a dark-green forehead, red shoulders, a white beak, a black jaw, and white eye-spots

Genus Guaruba Lesson, 1830 – one species
Common name	Scientific name	IUCN Red List Status	Range	Picture
Golden parakeet	G. guarouba (Gmelin, 1788)	gVU^{IUCN}	Southern border of the Amazon rainforest in Brazil, but regionally extinct near the coast	A yellow parrot with green-tipped wings and tan eye-spots

Genus †Conuropsis Salvadori, 1891 – one species
Common name	Scientific name	IUCN Red List Status	Range	Picture
Carolina parakeet	†C. carolinensis (Linnaeus, 1758)	aEX^{IUCN}	Formerly the eastern and southern United States	A green parrot with light-blue wings, yellow cheeks, an orange forehead, and a white eye-spot

Genus Cyanopsitta Bonaparte, 1854 – one species
Common name	Scientific name	IUCN Red List Status	Range	Picture
Spix's macaw	C. spixii (Wagler, 1832)	jEW^{IUCN}	Central eastern Brazil	A blue-grey parrot with a brown-grey head

Genus Orthopsittaca Ridgway, 1912 – one species
Common name	Scientific name	IUCN Red List Status	Range	Picture
Red-bellied macaw	O. manilatus (Boddaert, 1783)	LC^{IUCN}	Suriname, Guyana, French Guiana, eastern Venezuela, and northwestern Brazil stretching over into Bolivia, Peru, and Colombia	A green parrot with a light-yellow face, a blue forehead and blue speckles across the body

Genus Ara de Lacépède, 1799 – nine species
Common name	Scientific name	IUCN Red List Status	Range	Picture
Great green macaw	A. ambiguus (Bechstein, 1811)	EN^{IUCN}	Panama stretching over into Costa Rica and Colombia	A green parrot with a light-pink face, a red forehead, and blue-tipped wings
Blue-and-yellow macaw	A. ararauna (Linnaeus, 1758)	LC^{IUCN}	Northern South America excluding the Andes mountains and the coast of Brazil south of the Amazon river delta	A blue parrot with a white face, a green forehead, and a yellow underside and tail
Red-and-green macaw	A. chloropterus Gray, 1859	LC^{IUCN}	Suriname, Guyana, French Guiana, along the Panama/Colombia border, and western Brazil stretching over into Paraguay, Bolivia, Peru, Colombia, and Venezuela	A red parrot with a white face, blue wings, and green shoulders
Blue-throated macaw	A. glaucogularis Dabbene, 1921	CR^{IUCN}	Central Bolivia	A blue parrot with a white eye-patch and a yellow throat, cheeks, and underside
Scarlet macaw	A. macao (Linnaeus, 1758)	LC^{IUCN}	Northern Brazil stretching over into Bolivia, Peru, Colombia, Venezuela, Suriname, Guyana, and French Guiana. A second population lives on the coasts of Central America	A red parrot with a light-pink face, a white beak, a black jaw, yellow shoulders, and blue wings
Military macaw	A. militaris (Linnaeus, 1766)	gVU^{IUCN}	Southern Mexico, along the Colombia/Venezuela border, the northern Peru/Brazil border, and central Bolivia	A green parrot with a black beak, a light-pink face, a red forehead, and blue-tipped wings
Red-fronted macaw	A. rubrogenys de Lafresnaye, 1847	CR^{IUCN}	Central Bolivia	A green parrot with a red forehead and shoulders, blue-tipped wings, and white eye-spots
Chestnut-fronted macaw	A. severus (Linnaeus, 1758)	LC^{IUCN}	Northern South America, excluding the Andes mountains and the Brazil/Venezuela border	A green parrot with a white face, a maroon forehead, red shoulders, and blue-tipped wings
Cuban macaw	†A. tricolor (Bechstein, 1811)	aEX^{IUCN}	Formerly Cuba and Isla de la Juventud until 1885	A red parrot with a yellow nape, blue wings, and white eye-patches

Genus Primolius Bonaparte, 1857 – three species
Common name	Scientific name	IUCN Red List Status	Range	Picture
Golden-collared macaw	P. auricollis (Cassin, 1853)	LC^{IUCN}	Southeastern Bolivia stretching over into Brazil	A green parrot with a white face, a black forehead, blue-tipped wings, and a yellow nape
Blue-headed macaw	P. couloni (Sclater, 1876)	gVU^{IUCN}	Southern Peru east of the Andes, and the along the northern Bolivia/Brazil and Bolivia/Peru borders	A green parrot with a blue head and wing-tips
Blue-winged macaw	P. maracana (Vieillot, 1816)	iNT^{IUCN}	Southern Brazil	A green parrot with a white face, a blue-and-red forehead, blue-tipped wings, and a red underside

Genus Aratinga von Spix, 1824 – six species
Common name	Scientific name	IUCN Red List Status	Range	Picture
Golden-capped parakeet	A. auricapillus (Kuhl, 1820)	iNT^{IUCN}	Scattered populations in southeast Brazil, north of São Paulo	A green parrot with a yellow forehead and white eye-spots
Jandaya parakeet	A. jandaya (Gmelin, 1788)	LC^{IUCN}	Eastern Brazil	A yellow parrot with green wings and white eye-spots
Sulphur-breasted parakeet	A. maculata (Müller, 1776)	LC^{IUCN}	Scattered populations in Pará and Amapá (states in Brazil)	A yellow parrot with green wings and black eye-spots
Nanday parakeet	A. nenday (Vieillot, 1823)	LC^{IUCN}	Central Paraguay, spilling over to the southeastern Bolivia/Brazil border	A green parrot with a black face and forehead
Sun parakeet	A. solstitialis (Linnaeus, 1758)	eEN^{IUCN}	Northwest Roraima (a state in Brazil), and along the Brazil/Venezuela/Guyana border	A yellow parrot with orange cheeks, green-tipped wings and tail, and white eye-spots
Dusky-headed parakeet	A. weddellii (Deville, 1851)	LC^{IUCN}	Eastern South America, east of the Andes, south of the Colombia/Peru border, and north of central Bolivia	A green parrot with a light-grey head and white eye-spots

Genus Eupsittula Bonaparte, 1853 – six species
Common name	Scientific name	IUCN Red List Status	Range	Picture
Aztec parakeet	E. astec (de Souancé, 1857)	LC^{IUCN}	Middle America along the Caribbean Sea	A green parrot with a red-green underside and white eye-spots
Peach-fronted parakeet	E. aurea (Gmelin, 1788)	LC^{IUCN}	Brazil (excluding northwest Brazil), eastern Bolivia, and central Paraguay	A green parrot with a yellow underside and eye-spots, an orange forehead, and blue-tipped wings
Caatinga parakeet	E. cactorum (Kuhl, 1820)	LC^{IUCN}	The Caatinga region in Brazil	A green parrot with a yellow underside and white eye-spots
Orange-fronted parakeet	E. canicularis (Linnaeus, 1758)	LC^{IUCN}	Middle America bordering the Pacific Ocean (excluding the Gulf of California), and introduced to Puerto Rico	A green parrot with a light-green underside, pale-yellow eye-spots, and a blue-and-red forehead
Jamaican parakeet	E. nana (Vigors, 1830)	iNT^{IUCN}	Jamaica	A green parrot with white eye-spots and blue-tipped wings
Brown-throated parakeet	E. pertinax (Linnaeus, 1758)	LC^{IUCN}	Northern South America and Panama, introduced to the British Virgin Islands and Dominica	Mainland phenotype left, Antillean phenotype right

Genus Psittacara Vigors, 1837 – 12 species
Common name	Scientific name	IUCN Red List Status	Range	Picture
Blue-crowned parakeet	P. acuticaudatus (Vieillot, 1818)	LC^{IUCN}	Northern Venezuela, southwest Bolivia, Paraguay, northern Argentina (west of the Andes and excluding the coast), and the Caatinga	A green parrot with a blue forehead, yellow eye-spots, orange irises, and a light-green underside
Socorro parakeet	P. brevipes (Lawrence, 1871)	NE^{IUCN} (Note: Officially Psittacara holochlorus brevipes, a subspecies of green parakeet, by the IUCN)	Socorro Island	
Hispaniolan parakeet	P. chloropterus de Souancé, 1856	gVU^{IUCN}	Scattered areas in Hispaniola	A green parrot with white eye-spots
Red-masked parakeet	P. erythrogenys Lesson, 1844	iNT^{IUCN}	Ecuador and northern Peru, west of the Andes mountains	A green parrot with a red face, forehead, and shoulders, with white eye-spots
Cuban parakeet	P. euops (Wagler, 1832)	gVU^{IUCN}	Scattered areas in Cuba	A green parrot with red shoulders and white eye-spots
Finsch's parakeet	P. finschi (Salvin, 1871)	LC^{IUCN}	Costa Rica, Nicaragua, and western Panama (along the Pacific Ocean)	A green parrot with red shoulders and forehead, and white eye-spots
Cordilleran parakeet	P. frontatus (Cabanis, 1846)	iNT^{IUCN}	Peru west of the Andes mountains	
Green parakeet	P. holochlorus (Sclater, 1859)	LC^{IUCN}	Mexico east of the Sierra Madre Oriental and west of the Sierra Madre Occidental, and Honduras and Guatemala bordering the Pacific Ocean	A green parrot with black eye-spots
Guadeloupe parakeet	†P. labati (Rothschild, 1905)	aEX^{IUCN}	Formerly Guadeloupe until the mid-18th century	A green parrot with a red forehead
White-eyed parakeet	P. leucophthalmus (Müller, 1776)	LC^{IUCN}	Central South America and the northeast coast	A green parrot with red shoulders and white eye-spots
Puerto Rican parakeet	†P. maugei Souancé, 1856	NE^{IUCN} (Note: Officially Psittacara chloropterus maugei, a subspecies of Hispaniolan parakeet, by the IUCN)	Formerly Puerto Rico until the mid-19th century	A green parrot with a red forehead
Mitred parakeet	P. mitratus (von Tschudi, 1844)	LC^{IUCN}	Andes mountains in Bolivia, southern Peru, and northern Argentina	A green parrot with a red face and forehead, and white eye-spots
Red-throated parakeet	P. rubritorquis (Sclater, 1887)	LC^{IUCN}	Honduras, southern Guatemala, and northern Nicaragua, excluding the coasts	A green parrot with a light-green underside and a yellow-speckled throat
Pacific parakeet	P. strenuus (Ridgway, 1915)	NE^{IUCN} (Note: Officially Psittacara holochlorus strenuus, a subspecies of green parakeet, by the IUCN)	western Nicaragua	A green parrot
Scarlet-fronted parakeet	P. wagleri (Gray, 1845)	iNT^{IUCN}	Andes mountains in Colombia and Venezuela	A green parrot with a red forehead and shoulder

Genus Pionites (caiques) Heine, 1890 – four species
Common name	Scientific name	IUCN Red List Status	Range	Picture
Green-thighed parrot	P. leucogaster (Kuhl, 1820)	eEN^{IUCN}	North central Brazil	A green parrot with a yellow head, an orange forehead and nape, a white underside, pink eye-spots, and red irises
Black-legged parrot	P. xanthomerius (Sclater, 1858)	LC^{IUCN}	Northern Bolivia, eastern Peru, and western Brazil around the Peru/Brazil and Bolivia/Brazil borders	A parrot with green wings, yellow legs and cheeks, a white underside, and an orange forehead and nape
Yellow-tailed parrot	P. xanthurus (Todd, 1925)	gVU^{IUCN}	Northwest Brazil	
Black-headed parrot	P. melanocephalus (Linnaeus, 1758)	LC^{IUCN}	Suriname, Guyana, French Guiana, and Northern Brazil stretching over into Bolivia, Peru, Colombia, Venezuela	A parrot with green wings, yellow legs and cheeks, a white underside, an orange nape, and a black forehead

Genus Deroptyus Wagler, 1832 – one species
Common name	Scientific name	IUCN Red List Status	Range	Picture
Red-fan parrot	D. accipitrinus (Linnaeus, 1758)	LC^{IUCN}	Suriname, Guyana, French Guiana, and Northern Brazil stretching over into Bolivia, Peru, Colombia, Venezuela	A brown-grey parrot with a white forehead and speckles spanning the head and neck, a red strip of feathers with blue-tips on the nape which also cover the underside, and green wings

Tribe Forpini

Genus Forpus Bonaparte, 1857 – eight species
Common name	Scientific name	IUCN Red List Status	Range	Picture
Pacific parrotlet	F. coelestis (Lesson, 1847)	LC^{IUCN}	Ecuador and northern Peru, west of the Andes mountains	A white parrot with beige and blue-tipped wings, a green tail, a yellow-green face and forehead, and a violet nape
Spectacled parrotlet	F. conspicillatus (de Lafresnaye, 1848)	LC^{IUCN}	Northern Colombia and eastern Panama	A green parrot whose males have blue eye-spots and blue tipped wings, whereas females have black-tipped wings and no eye-spots
Mexican parrotlet	F. cyanopygius (de Souancé, 1856)	iNT^{IUCN}	Sierra Madre Occidental	
Dusky-billed parrotlet	F. modestus (Cabanis, 1849)	LC^{IUCN}	Northern Bolivia, northern and eastern Peru, southern Colombia, western Brazil, and the mouth of the Amazon river	A yellow-green parrot with green wings, nape, and tail
Green-rumped parrotlet	F. passerinus (Linnaeus, 1758)	LC^{IUCN}	Northern Atlantic coast of South America, and introduced to Barbados and Jamaica	A green parrot with blue wings
Turquoise-winged parrotlet	Forpus spengeli (Hartlaub, 1885)	LC^{IUCN}	Pacific coast of Colombia	
Yellow-faced parrotlet	F. xanthops (Salvin, 1895)	gVU^{IUCN}	Marañón Valley, Peru	A blue-grey parrot with a yellow underside, cheeks, and forehead, and blue-tipped wings
Cobalt-rumped parrotlet	F. xanthopterygius (von Spix, 1824) (Note: The species authority is Johann Baptist von Spix, 1824, by the IOC, however the IUCN considers it to be Władysław Taczanowski, 1883)	LC^{IUCN}	Eastern Brazil, central Bolivia, and Peru east of the Andes mountains	A green parrot with blue-tipped wings
Riparian parrotlet	F. crassirostris (Taczanowski, 1883)	NE	Southeastern Colombia to western Brazil and northern Peru	

Tribe Amoropsittacini

Genus Psilopsiagon Ridgway, 1912 – two species
Common name	Scientific name	IUCN Red List Status	Range	Picture
Mountain parakeet	P. aurifrons (Lesson, 1831)	LC^{IUCN}	Andes mountains in Peru, Bolivia, and Argentina	A green parrot with a yellow face and underside, and blue-tipped wings
Grey-hooded parakeet	P. aymara (d'Orbigny, 1839)	LC^{IUCN}	Andes mountains in Bolivia and Argentina	A green parrot with a white underside and cheeks, and a black forehead

Genus Bolborhynchus Bonaparte, 1857 – three species
Common name	Scientific name	IUCN Red List Status	Range	Picture
Rufous-fronted parakeet	B. ferrugineifrons (Lawrence, 1880)	gVU^{IUCN}	Andes mountains in southern Colombia	
Barred parakeet	B. lineola (Cassin, 1853)	LC^{IUCN}	Andes mountains excluding those in Chile and Argentina, and the mountains of Central America	A green parrot with dark-green wing-tips
Andean parakeet	B. orbygnesius (de Souancé, 1856)	LC^{IUCN}	Andes mountains of Bolivia and Peru	A green parrot with a light-green underside

Genus Nannopsittaca Ridgway, 1912 – two species
Common name	Scientific name	IUCN Red List Status	Range	Picture
Manu parrotlet	N. dachilleae O'Neill, Munn, and Franke, 1991	iNT^{IUCN}	Southern Peru, north of the Andes mountains, along the Peru/Bolivia border	
Tepui parrotlet	N. panychlora (Salvin and Godman, 1883)	LC^{IUCN}	Scattered in southern Venezuela	on top

Genus Touit Gray, 1855 – eight species
Common name	Scientific name	IUCN Red List Status	Range	Picture
Lilac-tailed parrotlet	T. batavicus (Boddaert, 1783)	LC^{IUCN}	Northern Guyana, Suriname, and French Guiana	A parrot with grey wings, a light-blue underside, blue-tipped wings, a violet tail, and a light-green head
Scarlet-shouldered parrotlet	T. huetii (Temminck, 1830)	gVU^{IUCN}	Andes mountains in Peru and Ecuador, western Venezuela, northern Guyana, and north central Brazil	Green parrot with yellow head and black tail tips
Red-fronted parrotlet	T. costaricensis (Cory, 1913)	gVU^{IUCN}	Mountains of Costa Rica and western Panama	
Blue-fronted parrotlet	T. dilectissimus (Sclater and Salvin, 1871)	LC^{IUCN}	Ecuador and Colombia west of the Andes mountains	A green parrot with blue-tipped wings, a black face, and white eye-spots
Brown-backed parrotlet	T. melanonotus (Wied-Neuwied, 1820)	eEN^{IUCN}	Southeast coast of Brazil	Green parrot with blue back and yellow eye-spot
Sapphire-rumped parrotlet	T. purpuratus (Gmelin, 1788)	LC^{IUCN}	Northeast South America, stretching to the Peru/Colombia/Ecuador border	
Spot-winged parrotlet	T. stictopterus (Sclater, 1862)	gVU^{IUCN}	Andes mountains in Ecuador	A green parrot with a light-green underside, red shoulders and marks around the eyes, a white forehead, and black eye-spots
Golden-tailed parrotlet	T. surdus (Kuhl, 1820)	gVU^{IUCN}	Coast of Brazil, excluding the northeast coast	

Tribe Androglossini

Genus Pionopsitta Bonaparte, 1854 – one species
Common name	Scientific name	IUCN Red List Status	Range	Picture
Pileated parrot	P. pileata (Scopoli, 1769)	LC^{IUCN}	Southern Paraguay, and the southeast coast of Brazil	A green parrot with a red forehead, and blue eye-spots and wings

Genus Triclaria Wagler, 1832 – one species
Common name	Scientific name	IUCN Red List Status	Range	Picture
Blue-bellied parrot	T. malachitacea (von Spix, 1824)	iNT^{IUCN}	Fragmented populations near Rio de Janeiro, São Paulo, and Rio Grande do Sul	A green parrot whose males have a purple patch on their belly

Genus Pyrilia Bonaparte, 1856 – seven species
Common name	Scientific name	IUCN Red List Status	Range	Picture
Bald parrot	P. aurantiocephala (Gaban-Lima, Raposo, and Hofling, 2002)	iNT^{IUCN}	Lower Madeira and Upper Tapajós rivers	A green parrot with blue-tipped wings and no feathers on the head, revealing orange skin
Orange-cheeked parrot	P. barrabandi (Kuhl, 1820)	iNT^{IUCN}	Northwest South America east of the Andes mountains	A green parrot red-tipped wings, a yellow collar and cheek, a black head, and white eye-spots
Caica parrot	P. caica (Latham, 1790)	iNT^{IUCN}	Roraima, Pará, French Guiana, Suriname, Guyana, and eastern Venezuela	A green parrot with a yellow neck, a black head, and red irises
Brown-hooded parrot	P. haematotis (Sclater and Salvin, 1860)	LC^{IUCN}	Central America, excluding the mountain ranges	A green parrot with a yellow neck, a brown head and tail and white eye-spots
Rose-faced parrot	P. pulchra (von Berlepsch, 1897)	LC^{IUCN}	Ecuador and Colombia west of the Andes mountains	
Saffron-headed parrot	P. pyrilia (Bonaparte, 1853)	iNT^{IUCN}	Andes mountains in Colombia and western Venezuela	A green parrot with orange-yellow cheeks and nape, a maroon face and forehead, and white eye-spots
Vulturine parrot	P. vulturina (Kuhl, 1820)	gVU^{IUCN}	Pará south of the Amazon river	

Genus Pionus Wagler, 1832 – 8 species
Common name	Scientific name	IUCN Red List Status	Range	Picture
Bronze-winged parrot	P. chalcopterus (Fraser, 1841)	LC^{IUCN}	Andes mountains in Ecuador, Colombia, and Venezuela	A blue parrot with a beige throat and speckles extending across the underside, brown wings with blue-edges, and a red underside of the tail
Dusky parrot	P. fuscus (Müller, 1776)	LC^{IUCN}	Northeast South America and along the Colombia/Venezuela border west of Lake Maracaibo	A grey parrot with dark grey wings and nape, and blue-tipped wings
Scaly-headed parrot	P. maximiliani (Kuhl, 1820)	LC^{IUCN}	Paraguay, southern Brazil, and east and central Bolivia	A green-yellow parrot with a light-grey collar and face, white eye-spots, and a red underside of the tail
Blue-headed parrot	P. menstruus (Linnaeus, 1766)	LC^{IUCN}	Northern and central South America, excluding the Andes	A green parrot with a blue head and dark-grey eye-spots
White-crowned parrot	P. senilis (von Spix, 1824)	LC^{IUCN}	Central America bordering the Caribbean Sea and the Sierra Madre Oriental	A blue-grey parrot with a light-blue underside, green wings, brown shoulders, a white forehead, orange eye-spots, and a red underside of the tail
White-capped parrot	P. seniloides (Massena and de Souancé, 1854)	LC^{IUCN}	Andes mountains in Venezuela, Colombia, Ecuador, and northern Peru	
Red-billed parrot	P. sordidus (Linnaeus, 1758)	LC^{IUCN}	Andes mountains in Bolivia, Venezuela, Ecuador, northern Peru, and southern Colombia	A green parrot with a violet collar, a black mark in front of their eyes above the beak, and a red underside of the tail
Speckle-faced parrot	P. tumultuosus (von Tschudi, 1844)	LC^{IUCN}	Andes mountains in southern Peru and northern Bolivia	A green parrot with a blue collar and a red head with white speckles

Genus Graydidascalus Bonaparte, 1854 – one species
Common name	Scientific name	IUCN Red List Status	Range	Picture
Short-tailed parrot	G. brachyurus (Temminck & Kuhl, 1820)	LC^{IUCN}	Along the Amazon river	A green parrot with a light-green underside and head

Genus Alipiopsitta Caparroz and Pacheco, 2006 – one species
Common name	Scientific name	IUCN Red List Status	Range	Picture
Yellow-faced parrot	A. xanthops (von Spix, 1824)	iNT^{IUCN}	Central Brazil south of the Amazon	A green parrot with a yellow head, white eye-spots, and blue horizontal stripes across its body except for the head

Genus Amazona (Amazon parrots) Lesson, 1830 – 35 species
Common name	Scientific name	IUCN Red List Status	Range	Picture
Blue-fronted amazon	A. aestiva (Linnaeus, 1758)	LC^{IUCN}	Paraguay, western Bolivia, northern Argentina, southern Brazil	A green parrot with red-tipped wings, a yellow face and forehead, and light-blue marks above the beak
Black-billed amazon	A. agilis (Linnaeus, 1758)	VU^{IUCN}	Central Jamaica	A green parrot with violet-edged wings, and black eye-spots
White-fronted amazon	A. albifrons (Sparrman, 1788)	LC^{IUCN}	Northwest Costa Rica, western Nicaragua, western Honduras, Western Mexico, and the Yucatán Peninsula	A green parrot with a red face, a white-and-blue forehead, and grey eye-spots
Orange-winged amazon	A. amazonica (Linnaeus, 1766)	LC^{IUCN}	Northern South America and the southeast coast of Brazil	A green parrot with yellow cheeks and a black face
Red-necked amazon	A. arausiaca (Müller, 1776)	gVU^{IUCN}	Central Dominica	A green parrot with red-tipped wings and a blue face whose males have a red mark on their throat
Yellow-naped amazon	A. auropalliata (Lesson, 1842)	gVU^{IUCN}	Pacific coast of Guatemala, Honduras, Nicaragua, northern Costa Rica, and southern Mexico	A green parrot with a yellow nape and forehead
Red-lored amazon	A. autumnalis (Linnaeus, 1758)	LC^{IUCN}	Central America, northern Colombia, and the Sierra Madre Oriental	A green parrot with a red forehead and yellow cheeks
Yellow-shouldered amazon	A. barbadensis (Gmelin, 1788)	gVU^{IUCN}	Margarita Island, Blanquilla Island, Curaçao, Bonaire, and northern Venezuela	A green parrot with yellow shoulders and head, and white eye-spots
Red-tailed amazon	A. brasiliensis (Linnaeus, 1758)	gVU^{IUCN}	Southern coast of São Paulo	A green parrot with light-brown cheeks, a red forehead, and white eye-spots
Yellow-billed amazon	A. collaria (Linnaeus, 1758)	gVU^{IUCN}	Jamaica	A green parrot with blue-edged wings, a light-brown forehead, and white eye-spots
Diademed amazon	A. diadema (von Spix, 1824)	eEN^{IUCN}	Northeast Amazonas	A green parrot with red-tipped wings and forehead, and white eye-spots
Blue-cheeked amazon	A. dufresniana (Shaw, 1812)	iNT^{IUCN}	Suriname, French Guiana, Guyana, and east Venezuela	A green parrot with light-blue cheeks, a yellow forehead, and white eye-spots
Festive amazon	A. festiva (Linnaeus, 1758)	iNT^{IUCN}	Along the Amazon river	A green parrot with a red forehead and eye, and blue eyebrows
Lilac-crowned amazon	A. finschi (Sclater, 1864)	eEN^{IUCN}	Pacific coast of Mexico	A green parrot with a red forehead and grey eye-spots
Mealy amazon	A. farinosa (Boddaert, 1783)	iNT^{IUCN}	Central and South America	A green parrot with a blue forehead and white eye-spots
Saint Vincent amazon	A. guildingii (Vigors, 1837)	VU^{IUCN}	Northeast St Vincent and the Grenadines	A brown parrot with blue-tipped wings, a yellow-tipped tail, a green nape, a yellow head, a white forehead, and light-blue eye-spots
Imperial amazon	A. imperialis Richmond, 1899	eEN^{IUCN}	Dominica	A green parrot with a violet underside, a dark-violet head, and a dark-purple nape
Kawall's amazon	A. kawalli Grantsau and Camargo, 1989	iNT^{IUCN}	Southern Amazonas and eastern Pará	A green parrot
Cuban amazon	A. leucocephala (Linnaeus, 1758)	iNT^{IUCN}	Cuba, the Isle of Pines, Abaco Islands, Great Inagua, and the Cayman Islands	A green parrot with a pink throat and cheeks, a white face and forehead, and blue-tipped wings
Lilacine amazon	A. lilacina (Lesson, 1844)	eEN^{IUCN}	Ecuador west of the Andes mountains	A green parrot with yellow cheeks and a red forehead
Martinique amazon	†A. martinicana Clark, 1905	aEX^{IUCN}	Formerly Martinique until 1779	A green parrot with a blue-grey head and a red forehead
Scaly-naped amazon	A. mercenarius (von Tschudi, 1844)	LC^{IUCN}	Andes mountains in Venezuela, Colombia, Ecuador, Peru, and northern Bolivia	A green parrot with a green-yellow underside
Yellow-crowned amazon	A. ochrocephala (Gmelin, 1788)	LC^{IUCN}	Northern South America, east of the Andes	A green parrot with a yellow forehead, blue underarms, and white eye-spots
Yellow-headed amazon	A. oratrix Ridgway, 1887	eEN^{IUCN}	Scattered coastal areas of southern Mexico	A green parrot with a yellow forehead, red wing-tips, and white eye-spots
Red-spectacled amazon	A. pretrei (Temminck, 1830)	gVU^{IUCN}	Scattered populations in central Rio Grande do Sul	A green parrot with a red forehead, blue-tipped wings, and white eye-spots
Red-browed amazon	A. rhodocorytha (Salvadori, 1890)	eEN^{IUCN}	Scattered populations along the southeast coastline of Brazil	A green parrot with light-blue cheeks, a yellow mark between the eyes and the beak, a red forehead, a brown nape, and light-grey eye-spots
Tucumán amazon	A. tucumana (Cabanis, 1885)	gVU^{IUCN}	Andes mountains in northern Argentina and southern Bolivia	A green parrot with black-tipped wings, a red forehead, and white eye-spots
Hispaniolan amazon	A. ventralis (Müller, 1776)	gVU^{IUCN}	Hispaniola, Grande Cayemite, Gonâve, Beata, and Saona Island, and introduced to Puerto Rico, St Croix, and St. Thomas Island	A green parrot with a pink-speckled belly, dark-grey cheeks, and a white forehead and eye-spots
Saint Lucia amazon	A. versicolor (Müller, 1776)	gVU^{IUCN}	St Lucia	A green parrot with a dark-blue head, and a black forehead and wing-tips
Vinaceous-breasted amazon	A. vinacea (Kuhl, 1820)	eEN^{IUCN}	Southern Brazil no farther south than the southern tip of Paraguay	A green parrot with a light-brown throat, a dark red mark between the eyes and the beak, and white eye-spots
Guadeloupe amazon	†A. violacea (Gmelin, 1789)	aEX^{IUCN}	Formerly Guadeloupe until 1779	A green parrot with a dark grey head and underside
Red-crowned amazon	A. viridigenalis (Cassin, 1853)	eEN^{IUCN}	Sierra Madre Occidental	A green parrot with a blue-grey nape, and a red forehead
Puerto Rican amazon	A. vittata (Boddaert, 1783)	CR^{IUCN}	Former range left, current range right	A green parrot with blue-tipped wings, a red forehead, and white eye-spots
Yucatán amazon	A. xantholora (Gray, 1859)	LC^{IUCN}	Yucatán Peninsula	A green parrot with a blue forehead, grey-tipped feathers on the throat, a yellow mark between the eyes and beak, and white eye-spots

Genus Hapalopsittaca Ridgway, 1912 – four species
Common name	Scientific name	IUCN Red List Status	Range	Picture
Rusty-faced parrot	H. amazonina (des Murs, 1845)	gVU^{IUCN}	Andes mountains in Colombia and Venezuela	A green parrot with a red-orange head, a yellow throat, a light-green underside, blue-tipped wings and tail, and pink eye-spots
Fuertes's parrot	H. fuertesi (Chapman, 1912)	CR^{IUCN}	Andes mountains in central Colombia	
Black-winged parrot	H. melanotis (de Lafresnaye, 1847)	LC^{IUCN}	Andes mountains in northern Bolivia and central Peru	A green parrot a light-blue head, green cheeks, black shoulders and eye-spots, and blue-edged wings
Red-faced parrot	H. pyrrhops (Salvin, 1876)	gEN^{IUCN}	Andes mountains in southern Ecuador	A green parrot with red shoulders and face, a light-blue forehead, violet-tipped wings, a blue-tipped tail, and grey eye-spots

Genus Brotogeris Vigors, 1825 – eight species
Common name	Scientific name	IUCN Red List Status	Range	Picture
Yellow-chevroned parakeet	B. chiriri (Vieillot, 1818)	LC^{IUCN}	Southern Brazil, eastern Bolivia and Paraguay, and introduced to California around Los Angeles and San Francisco, and southern Florida	A green parrot with white eye-spots and yellow shoulders
Golden-winged parakeet	B. chrysoptera (Linnaeus, 1766)	LC^{IUCN}	French Guiana, Guyana, Suriname, eastern Venezuela, and northeast Brazil	A green parrot with a red forehead, yellow shoulders, and white eye-spots
Cobalt-winged parakeet	B. cyanoptera (Pelzeln, 1870)	LC^{IUCN}	Northwest South America, east of the Andes mountains	A green parrot with blue-tipped wings, a light-blue forehead, and white eye-spots
Orange-chinned parakeet	B. jugularis (Müller, 1776)	LC^{IUCN}	Panama, Costa Rica, Nicaragua, southern El Salvador and Guatemala, northern Colombia, and northwest Venezuela	A green parrot with a light green underside and an orange mark under the jaw
Grey-cheeked parakeet	B. pyrrhoptera (Latham, 1801)	eEN^{IUCN}	Ecuador, west of the Andes mountains	A green parrot with yellow cheeks and shoulders, blue marks between the eyes and beak, and white eye-spots
Tui parakeet	B. sanctithomae (Müller, 1776)	LC^{IUCN}	Northern Bolivia, eastern Peru, and along the Amazon river in Brazil	A green parrot with a light-green underside, yellow forehead, and white eye-spots
Plain parakeet	B. tirica (Gmelin, 1788)	LC^{IUCN}	Southern coast of Brazil	A light-green parrot with dark-green wings
White-winged parakeet	B. versicolurus (Müller, 1776)	LC^{IUCN}	Along the Amazon river, and introduced to California around Los Angeles and San Francisco	A green parrot with white eye-spots and mark around the beak

Genus Myiopsitta Bonaparte, 1854 – two species
Common name	Scientific name	IUCN Red List Status	Range	Picture
Cliff parakeet	M. luchsi (Finsch, 1868)	LC^{IUCN}	Andes mountains in Bolivia	A green parrot with a white head and chest, a light-green belly, blue-tipped wings and a blue-tipped tail
Monk parakeet	M. monachus (Boddaert, 1783)	LC^{IUCN}	Paraguay, Uruguay, and eastern Argentina, introduced to Puerto Rico, Guadeloupe, Japan, Virgin Islands, the southern and eastern United States, and western Europe	A green parrot with a white head and chest, a light-green belly, blue-tipped wings and a blue-tipped tail

=== Family Psittaculidae ===
==== Subfamily Platycercinae ====
Tribe Platycercini (broad-tailed parrots)

Genus Platycercus (rosellas) Vigors, 1825 – six species
Common name	Scientific name	IUCN Red List Status	Range	Picture
Western rosella	P. icterotis (Temminck & Kuhl, 1820)	LC^{IUCN}	Southwest Australia	A red parrot with black-and-green wings and tail, blue-edged wings, yellow cheeks, and grey eye-spots
Crimson rosella	P. elegans (Gmelin, 1788)	LC^{IUCN}	Tasmania and the coast of New South Wales, Victoria, and mid-Queensland	A red parrot with a violet chin with white speckles, navy blue wings with red-tipped feathers, blue-tipped wings, and a blue tail
Green rosella	P. caledonicus (Gmelin, 1788)	LC^{IUCN}	Tasmania and the Bass Strait islands	A green-yellow parrot with a blue chin, navy blue wings with blue-tipped feathers, blue-tipped wings, and a green-grey tail
Pale-headed rosella	P. adscitus (Latham, 1790)	LC^{IUCN}	Cape York Peninsula and northeastern New South Wales	A light-blue parrot with a white chin, navy blue wings with blue-tipped feathers, blue-tipped wings, a green-grey tail, and a black nape with yellow-tipped wings
Eastern rosella	P. eximius (Shaw, 1792)	LC^{IUCN}	Eastern Australia and Tasmania, naturalized in New Zealand	A red parrot with a yellow belly, black wings with yellow-tipped feathers, blue-tipped wings, blue tail, and a white chin
Northern rosella	P. venustus (Kuhl, 1820)	LC^{IUCN}	Western half of the Gulf of Carpentaria to the Kimberley	A parrot with a white underside with black-tipped feathers, black wings with white-tipped feathers, lavender-edged wings, a lavender chin, and a black forehead

Genus Prosopeia (shining parrots) Bonaparte, 1854 – three species
Common name	Scientific name	IUCN Red List Status	Range	Picture
Masked shining parrot	P. personata (Gray, 1848)	iNT^{IUCN}	Viti Levu, the largest island of Fiji	A green parrot with a yellow underside, blue-tipped wings, and a black face and tail
Maroon shining parrot	P. tabuensis, (Gmelin, 1788)	LC^{IUCN}	Vanua Levu and Taveuni, which are two islands of Fiji	A dark-red parrot with green wings, blue-tipped wings, and a blue tail
Crimson shining parrot	P. splendens, (Peale, 1849)	gNT^{IUCN}	Kadavu and Ono, which are part of the Kadavu Group in Fiji	A dark-orange parrot with green wings, blue-tipped wings, and a blue tail

Genus Eunymphicus Peters, 1937 – two species
Common name	Scientific name	IUCN Red List Status	Range	Picture
Horned parakeet	E. cornutus, (Gmelin, 1788)	gVU^{IUCN}	New Caledonia	A green parrot with blue-tipped wings, a yellow nape, a black face, a red forehead, and two long, black tufts of feathers extending from the forehead to behind the head with red at the ends
Ouvea parakeet	E. uvaeensis (Layard, EL & Layard, ELC, 1882)	eEN^{IUCN}	Uvea, an island of Loyalty Islands, and New Caledonia	A green parrot with a dark-green face

Genus Cyanoramphus Bonaparte, 1854 – seven species
Common name	Scientific name	IUCN Red List Status	Range	Picture
Yellow-crowned parakeet	C. auriceps (Kuhl, 1820)	iNT^{IUCN}	New Zealand, Stewart Island, and Auckland Island	A green parrot with blue-tipped wings, an orange forehead, and a red mark above the beak
Malherbe's parakeet	C. malherbi de Souancé, 1857	CR^{IUCN}	South Island (of New Zealand)	A green parrot with blue-tipped wings, a yellow forehead, and an orange mark above the beak
Red-crowned parakeet	C. novaezelandiae (Sparrman, 1787)	iNT^{IUCN}	New Zealand and several nearby islands, New Caledonia, and Norfolk Island	A green parrot with blue-tipped wings and a red forehead
Society parakeet	†C. ulietanus (Gmelin, 1788)	aEX^{IUCN}	Formerly Raiatea, an island of the Society Islands in French Polynesia until 1777	
Antipodes parakeet	C. unicolor (Lear, 1831)	gVU^{IUCN}	Antipodes Islands of New Zealand	A green parrot with a light-green underside
Black-fronted parakeet	†C. zealandicus (Latham, 1790)	aEX^{IUCN}	Formerly Tahiti and French Polynesia until 1844	A green parrot with blue-tipped wings, a red back and cheeks, and brown eye-spots

Genus Barnardius Bonaparte 1854 – one species
Common name	Scientific name	IUCN Red List Status	Range	Picture
Australian ringneck	B. zonarius (Shaw, 1805)	LC^{IUCN}	Australian mainland, excluding the northern and eastern coasts	A green parrot with blue-tipped wings, a dark-green throat, a black head, a red forehead, a dark-violet chin, and a green-yellow underside

Genus Purpureicephalus Bonaparte 1854 – one species
Common name	Scientific name	IUCN Red List Status	Range	Picture
Red-capped parrot	P. spurius (Kuhl, 1820)	LC^{IUCN}	Southwestern tip of Australia	A dark-green parrot with blue-tipped wings, a blue-tipped tail, yellow cheeks, and a red forehead

Genus Lathamus Lesson 1830 – one species
Common name	Scientific name	IUCN Red List Status	Range	Picture
Swift parrot	L. discolor Shaw, 1790	CR^{IUCN}	Coast of New South Wales, Victoria, and Tasmania	A green parrot with blue shoulders, a blue-green head, a blue forehead, and a red mark above and below the beak

Genus Northiella Mathews 1912 – two species
Common name	Scientific name	IUCN Red List Status	Range	Picture
Eastern bluebonnet	N. haematogaster (Gould, 1838)	LC^{IUCN}	New South Wales and into Southern Australia and the southeastern corner of Western Australia	A grey parrot with yellow-and-blue-tipped wings, red ankles, and a violet face
Naretha bluebonnet	N. narethae (HL White, 1921)	NE^{IUCN} (Note: Officially listed as Northiella haematogaster narethae, a subspecies of eastern bluebonnet, by the IUCN)	southeastern Western Australia, southwestern South Australia	

Genus Psephotus Gould 1845 – one species
Common name	Scientific name	IUCN Red List Status	Range	Picture
Red-rumped parrot	P. haematonotus (Gould, 1838)	LC^{IUCN}	New South Wales and southern Queensland	The females are brown with a white underside with several black, half-circular marks across the body. The males are green with a bright-blue face and wings, blue-tipped wings, and a yellow belly

Genus Psephotellus Mathews 1913 – four species
Common name	Scientific name	IUCN Red List Status	Range	Picture
Mulga parrot	P. varius (Clark, 1910)	LC^{IUCN}	Southern and central Australia	The females have a brown head and neck, a green belly, and blue-green wings and tail. The males are blue-green with orange shoulders and mark above the beak, and red ankles
Hooded parrot	P. dissimilis (Collett, 1898)	LC^{IUCN}	Northern Territory	The females are green with a grey forehead and bright-blue tail. The males are bright-blue with a black forehead, yellow shoulders, and brown wings
Golden-shouldered parrot	P. chrysopterygius (Gould, 1858)	eEN^{IUCN}	Cape York Peninsula	The females are green. The males are bright-blue with a black forehead, yellow shoulders, grey wings, and a red belly
Paradise parrot	†P. pulcherrimus (Gould, 1845)	aEX^{IUCN}	Formerly eastern Australia until 1928	The females are yellow-brown with a black forehead and wings, and red shoulders. The males are blue with a black forehead, nape, wings, and tail; and red shoulders, belly, and mark above the beak

Tribe Pezoporini
Bonaparte, 1837

Genus Neophema Salvadori 1891 – six species
Common name	Scientific name	IUCN Red List Status	Range	Picture
Blue-winged parrot	N. chrysostoma (Kuhl, 1820)	VU^{IUCN}	Western New South Wales, eastern Southern Australia, and a resident population in Tasmania and the southern coast of New South Wales	A yellow parrot with blue-tipped wings and blue marks between the eyes and the beak
Elegant parrot	N. elegans (Gould, 1837)	LC^{IUCN}	Southwestern Western Australia and southeastern South Australia	A yellow parrot with blue wingtips and marks between the eyes and the beak
Rock parrot	N. petrophila (Gould, 1841)	LC^{IUCN}	Spencer Gulf, Peron Peninsula, and the southwest coast of Western Australia	A green-brown parrot with a blue mark above the beak
Orange-bellied parrot	N. chrysogaster (Latham, 1790)	CR^{IUCN}	Melaleuca, Tasmania and they spend winter in the southern coast of Victoria	A light-green parrot with a green-yellow underside, and blue wingtips and marks above the beak
Turquoise parrot	N. pulchella (Shaw, 1792)	LC^{IUCN}	Coast of New South Wales	A blue parrot with a yellow underside and a green nape. The females have a green head and the males have a blue head
Scarlet-chested parrot	N. splendida (Gould, 1841)	LC^{IUCN}	Large patches in the southern half of Australia	A green parrot with a red chest, a yellow underside, and a blue head

Genus Neopsephotus Mathews 1912 – one species
Common name	Scientific name	IUCN Red List Status	Range	Picture
Bourke's parrot	N. bourkii (Gould, 1841)	LC^{IUCN}	Western and South Australia, and central Australia	A purple parrot with a pink underside, blue-edged wings, and black wings with white-edged feathers

Genus Pezoporus Illiger 1811 – three species
Common name	Scientific name	IUCN Red List Status	Range	Picture
Night parrot	P. occidentalis (Gould, 1861)	eCR^{IUCN}	Known locations since 1950	A green parrot with black-edged feathers and wing-tips, and a light green underside
Ground parrot	P. wallicus (Kerr, 1792)	LC^{IUCN}	in orange	A green parrot with black-edged feathers and wing-tips, and a light green underside

==== Subfamily Psittacellinae ====
Genus Psittacella (tiger parrots) Schlegel 1871 – four species
Common name	Scientific name	IUCN Red List Status	Range	Picture
Madarasz's tiger parrot	P. madaraszi Meyer, 1886	LC^{IUCN}	New Guinea Highlands	
Modest tiger parrot	P. modesta Schlegel, 1871	LC^{IUCN}	New Guinea Highlands	
Painted tiger parrot	P. picta Rothschild, 1896	LC^{IUCN}	New Guinea Highlands on the Papua New Guinea side	A green parrot with a red forehead, a black face, blue eye-spots, an orange underside-of-the-tail, a yellow nape, and a light green belly, whose males have a blue chest and females have a yellow chest
Brehm's tiger parrot	P. brehmii Schlegel, 1871	LC^{IUCN}	New Guinea Highlands	A green parrot with a dark green forehead, black-tipped feathers on the nape, and a light green underside

==== Subfamily Loriinae ====
Tribe Loriini
Selby, 1836

Genus Chalcopsitta Bonaparte 1850 – three species
Common name	Scientific name	IUCN Red List Status	Range	Picture
Black lory	C. atra (Scopoli, 1786)	LC^{IUCN}	West Papua	A dark purple parrot with a yellow tail and a red underside-of-the-tail
Brown lory	C. duivenbodei Dubois, 1884	LC^{IUCN}	Northern New Guinea	A grey parrot with yellow marks above and below the beak, yellow streaks on the nape, and brown wings
Yellow-streaked lory	C. scintillata (Temminck, 1835)	LC^{IUCN}	New Guinea, south of the New Guinea Highlands	A green parrot with a red forehead, yellow streaks on the underside, and a brown underside

Genus Eos Wagler 1832 – six species
Common name	Scientific name	IUCN Red List Status	Range	Picture
Black-winged lory	E. cyanogenia Bonaparte, 1850	gVU^{IUCN}	Schouten Islands	A red parrot with blue cheeks extending to the eyes, black eye-spots and wings
Violet-necked lory	E. squamata (Boddaert, 1783)	LC^{IUCN}	North Maluku	A red parrot with a violet neck and underside, and black eye-spots and wingtips
Blue-streaked lory	E. reticulata (Müller, 1841)	iNT^{IUCN}	Banda Sea islands	A red parrot with a dark blue streak behind the eyes, dark blue eye-spots, and black-tipped wings
Red-and-blue lory	E. histrio (Müller, 1776)	eEN^{IUCN}	Talaud Islands	A red parrot with a blue chest, nape, and forehead
Red lory	E. bornea (Linnaeus, 1758)	LC^{IUCN}	Seram Island, an island of the Maluka archipelago between the Banda and Ceram seas	A red parrot with a blue underside-of-the-tail
Blue-eared lory	E. semilarvata Bonaparte, 1850	LC^{IUCN}	Central Pulua Seram, and island of the Maluka archipelago between the Banda and Ceram seas	A red parrot with black eye-spots, a dark blue streak behind the eyes, and black wingtips and shoulders

Genus Pseudeos Peters 1935 – two species
Common name	Scientific name	IUCN Red List Status	Range	Picture
Dusky lory	P. fuscata (Blyth, 1858)	LC^{IUCN}	New Guinea	A black parrot with orange stripes
Cardinal lory	P. cardinalis (Note: Officially Chalcopsitta cardinalis by the IUCN) (Gray, 1849)	LC^{IUCN}	Solomon Islands	A red parrot with black eye-spots

Genus Trichoglossus Stephens 1826 – ten species
Common name	Scientific name	IUCN Red List Status	Range	Picture
Rainbow lorikeet	T. moluccanus (Gmelin, 1788)	LC^{IUCN}	Eastern Australian coast, introduced to Perth	A green parrot with a yellow nape and spots on the legs, a red chest with black-tipped feathers, and a blue-purple face
Sunset lorikeet	T. forsteni Bonaparte, 1850 i	NT^{IUCN}	Islands of Bali, Lombok, Sumbawa, Tanahjampea, and Kalaotoa	A green parrot with a black head and belly, a red chest, and a yellow nape
Leaf lorikeet	T. weberi (Büttikofer, 1894)	iNT^{IUCN}	Flores	A green parrot with a yellow-green chest and nape
Marigold lorikeet	T. capistratus (Bechstein, 1811)	LC^{IUCN}	Timor	A green parrot with a yellow chest, nape, and legs, and a blue forehead
Coconut lorikeet	T. haematodus (Linnaeus, 1771)	LC^{IUCN}	Maluku, New Guinea, Solomon Islands, Vanuatu, and New Caledonia	A green parrot with blue head and belly, and an yellow chest
Biak lorikeet	T. rosenbergii Schlegel, 1871	gVU^{IUCN}	Biak, and island of the Schouten Islands	A green parrot with a black head and underside, and a dark blue face
Red-collared lorikeet	T. rubritorquis Vigors and Horsfield, 1827	LC^{IUCN}	Northern Australia, excluding Cape York Peninsula	A green parrot with a blue head, an orange neck, and a black mark behind the nape and on the legs
Olive-headed lorikeet	T. euteles (Temminck, 1835)	LC^{IUCN}	East Nusa Tenggara and Timor	A green parrot with a yellow-green underside and a yellow head
Pohnpei lorikeet	T. rubiginosus (Bonaparte, 1850)	iNT^{IUCN}	Pohnpei, and island of Micronesia	A red-violet parrot with a yellow underside-of-the-tail
Scaly-breasted lorikeet	T. chlorolepidotus (Kuhl, 1820)	LC^{IUCN}	Eastern Australia	A green parrot with yellow stripes on the underside

Genus Saudareos Joseph et al., 2020 – 5 species
Common name	Scientific name	IUCN Red List Status	Range	Picture
Yellow-cheeked lorikeet	S. meyeri (Walden, 1871)	LC^{IUCN}	Sulawesi	
Mindanao lorikeet	S. johnstoniae (Hartert, 1903)	iNT^{IUCN}	Mindanao, the second largest island of the Philippines	A green parrot with a red-brown area around the beak, a red-violet stripe going around the head over the eyes, and yellow-tipped feathers on the underside
Sula lorikeet	S. flavoviridis Wallace, 1863	iLC^{IUCN}	Sula Islands	
Ornate lorikeet	S. ornatus (Linnaeus, 1758)	LC^{IUCN}	Sulawesi and surrounding islands	A green parrot with a black throat and forehead, red cheeks, and a yellow nape
Iris lorikeet	S. iris (Temminck, 1835)	LC^{IUCN}	Timor	A green parrot with a light green underside, a red forehead, and a violet mark behind the eyes

Genus Psitteuteles Bonaparte 1854 – one species
Common name	Scientific name	IUCN Red List Status	Range	Picture
Varied lorikeet	P. versicolor (Lear, 1831)	LC^{IUCN}	Northern Australia	A green parrot with yellow spots on the body excluding the wings, and a red forehead

Genus Glossoptilus Rothschild and Hartert, 1896 – one species
Common name	Scientific name	IUCN Red List Status	Range	Picture
Goldie's lorikeet	G. goldiei (Sharpe, 1882)	LC^{IUCN}	New Guinea Highlands	A green parrot with a light green underside, black-tipped wings, violet cheeks, a purple streak behind the eyes, and a red forehead

Genus Lorius Vigors 1825 – six species
Common name	Scientific name	IUCN Red List Status	Range	Picture
Chattering lory	L. garrulus (Linnaeus, 1758)	gVU^{IUCN}	North Maluku	A red parrot with green wings and ankles
Purple-naped lory	L. domicella (Linnaeus, 1758)	eEN^{IUCN}	Seram, Ambon, and possibly Haruku and Saparua of South Maluku	A green parrot with a red head and underside, a black forehead, and a violet nape
Black-capped lory	L. lory (Linnaeus, 1758)	LC^{IUCN}	New Guinea, excluding the New Guinea Highlands	A red parrot with a black forehead, a purple belly, a blue underside-of-the-tail, a yellow tail, and green wings
Purple-bellied lory	L. hypoinochrous Gray, 1859	LC^{IUCN}	New Britain, New Ireland, and the eastern coastline of the Papuan Peninsula	A red parrot with a black forehead, a dark purple belly, a blue underside-of-the-tail, and a yellow tail
White-naped lory	L. albidinucha (Rothschild and Hartert, 1924)	iNT^{IUCN}	New Ireland	
Yellow-bibbed lory	L. chlorocercus Gould, 1856	LC^{IUCN}	Southern Solomon Islands	A red parrot with a black forehead, a yellow throat, green wings, white shoulders, and blue ankles

Genus Vini Lesson, 1833 – 11 species
Common name	Scientific name	IUCN Red List Status	Range	Picture
Blue-crowned lorikeet	V. australis (Gmelin, 1788)	LC^{IUCN}	Various islands east of Fiji, including Samoa, and formerly Tonga and Wallis and Futuna	A green parrot with a red chin and throat, a violet belly, a blue forehead, and a small crest
Kuhl's lorikeet	V. kuhlii (Vigors, 1824)	eEN^{IUCN}	Washington Island, Fanning Island, and Christmas Island of Kiribati, and Rimatara of French Polynesia	Drawing of two parrots with a green back, red throat and belly, blue nape, and yellow central tail
Stephen's lorikeet	V. stepheni (North, 1908)	gVU^{IUCN}	Henderson Island in the Pitcairn Islands (UK)	Drawing of green parrot with red face and belly, green and black wings, and yellow tail
Blue lorikeet	V. peruviana (Müller, 1776)	gVU^{IUCN}	Eastern French Polynesia, and formerly central French Polynesia	Blue parrot with white chin and neck
Ultramarine lorikeet	V. ultramarina (Kuhl, 1820)	eEN^{IUCN}	Marquesas Islands	Drawing of a green parrot with a brown face and chest with white spots, a black chest ring below, and white belly. A Blue lorikeet is also pictured above.
Collared lory	V. solitaria (Suckow, 1800)	LC^{IUCN}	Fiji	A green parrot with a red head and underside, and a black forehead
Meek's lorikeet	V. meeki (Rothschild and Hartert, 1901)	iLC^{IUCN}	Bougainville Island and six islands of the Solomon Islands	
Red-chinned lorikeet	V. rubrigularis (Sclater, 1881)	LC^{IUCN}	New Britain, New Ireland, New Hanover Island, and Karkar Island	
New Caledonian lorikeet	V. diadema (Verreaux and des Murs, 1860)	CR^{IUCN}	Last official sighting in 1913 in New Caledonia	Drawing of two light green parrots with darker wings, red beaks, and yellow chins and tail tips
Red-throated lorikeet	V. amabilis (Ramsay, 1875)	CR^{IUCN}	Viti Levu, Vanua Levu, Taveuni and Ovalau (islands of Fiji)	Drawing of two green parrots with lighter bellies and red faces and necks, and one with no red and yellow and maroon stripes on underside of wings
Palm lorikeet	V. palmarum (Gmelin, 1788)	gVU^{IUCN}	Santa Cruz and Vanuatu	

Genus Parvipsitta Mathews, 1916 – two species (Note: Synonymous with Glossopsitta according to the IUCN)
Common name	Scientific name	IUCN Red List Status	Range	Picture
Purple-crowned lorikeet	P. porphyrocephala (Note: Officially Glossopsitta porphyrocephala by the IUCN) (Dietrichsen, 1837)	LC^{IUCN}	Coastal south and south-western Australia	Green parrot with orange brow and cheeks, purple crown, and yellow tail
Little lorikeet	P. pusilla (Note: Officially Glossopsitta pusilla by the IUCN) (Shaw, 1790)	LC^{IUCN}	Coastal eastern Australia	Green parrot with a red face

Genus Glossopsitta Bonaparte, 1854 – one species
Common name	Scientific name	IUCN Red List Status	Range	Picture
Musk lorikeet	G. concinna (Shaw, 1791)	LC^{IUCN}	Southeast Australia and Tasmania	Green parrot with yellow spots on its back and a red stripe across the eyes

Genus Charminetta Iredale, 1956 – one species
Common name	Scientific name	IUCN Red List Status	Range	Picture
Pygmy lorikeet	C. wilhelminae (Meyer, 1874)	LC^{IUCN}	New Guinea Highlands	

Genus Hypocharmosyna Salvadori, 1891 – two species
Common name	Scientific name	IUCN Red List Status	Range	Picture
Red-fronted lorikeet	H. rubronotata	LC^{IUCN}	Northern New Guinea and West Papua	
Red-flanked lorikeet	H. placentis (Temminck, 1835)	LC^{IUCN}	New Guinea (excluding the New Guinea Highlands), North Maluku, Maluku, New Britain, New Ireland, and Bougainville Island	Two green parrots with red beaks, one male with red sides and blue cheeks, and one female with yellow flecked cheeks

Genus Charmosynopsis Salvadori, 1877 – two species
Common name	Scientific name	IUCN Red List Status	Range	Picture
Blue-fronted lorikeet	C. toxopei (Siebers, 1930)	CR^{IUCN}	Buru of Maluku	
Fairy lorikeet	C. pulchella (Gray, 1859)	LC^{IUCN}	New Guinea Highlands, West Papua, and Papuan Peninsula	Drawing of red parrot with green wings, nape, and upper tail, with yellow flecked chest

Genus Synorhacma Joseph et al., 2020 – one species
Common name	Scientific name	IUCN Red List Status	Range	Picture
Striated lorikeet	S. multistriata (Rothschild, 1911)	iLC^{IUCN}	New Guinea Highlands	

Genus Charmosynoides Joseph et al., 2020 – one species
Common name	Scientific name	IUCN Red List Status	Range	Picture
Duchess lorikeet	C. margarethae (Tristram, 1879)	iLC^{IUCN}	Bougainville Island and six islands of the Solomon Islands	Drawing of a red parrot with black crown, yellow neck ring and tail tips, and green wings

Genus Charmosyna Wagler, 1832 – 3 species
Common name	Scientific name	IUCN Red List Status	Range	Picture
Josephine's lorikeet	C. josefinae (Finsch, 1873)	LC^{IUCN}	New Guinea Highlands	Red parrot with black crown and green wings with yellow spots
West Papuan lorikeet	C. papou (Scopoli, 1786)	LC^{IUCN}	West Papua	Green parrot with red head, black stripe across the eyes, blue inner wings and yellow tail and wing tips
Stella's lorikeet	C. stellae Meyer, 1886	LC^{IUCN}	West Papua	

Genus Oreopsittacus Salvadori, 1877 – one species
Common name	Scientific name	IUCN Red List Status	Range	Picture
Plum-faced lorikeet	O. arfaki (Meyer, 1874)	LC^{IUCN}	New Guinea Highlands	Two green parrots with red tails and belly patches, deep purple faces with a white stripe, one with a red crown

Genus Neopsittacus Salvadori, 1875 – two species
Common name	Scientific name	IUCN Red List Status	Range	Picture
Yellow-billed lorikeet	N. musschenbroekii (Schlegel, 1871)	LC^{IUCN}	New Guinea Highlands	Two green parrots with red bellies and large yellow beaks
Orange-billed lorikeet	N. pullicauda Hartert, 1896	LC^{IUCN}	New Guinea Highlands	Drawing of two green parrots with orange beaks and red bellies and tail and wing tips

Tribe Melopsittacini

Genus Melopsittacus Gould, 1840 – one species
Common name	Scientific name	IUCN Red List Status	Range	Picture
Budgerigar	M. undulatus (Shaw, 1805)	LC^{IUCN}	Non-coastal Australia	Green parrot with yellow head and yellow and black patterned wings

Tribe Cyclopsittini (fig parrots)

Genus Cyclopsitta Reichenbach, 1850 – four species
Common name	Scientific name	IUCN Red List Status	Range	Picture
Blue-fronted fig parrot	C. gulielmitertii (Schlegel, 1866)	LC^{IUCN}	Salawati and the Bird's Head Peninsula in New Guinea	Female left, male right
Black-fronted fig parrot	C. nigrifrons Reichenow, 1891	LC	northern New Guinea	
Dusky-cheeked fig parrot	C. melanogenia (Rosenberg, HKB, 1866)	LC	southern New Guinea and Aru Island	
Double-eyed fig parrot	C. diophthalma (Hombron and Jacquinot, 1841)	LC^{IUCN}	Aru Islands, Waigeo, New Guinea, and the eastern coast of Cape York Peninsula	Green parrot with red cheeks and brow, and blue temples

Genus Psittaculirostris G. R. Gray and J. E. Gray, 1859 – three species
Common name	Scientific name	IUCN Red List Status	Range	Picture
Large fig parrot	P. desmarestii (Desmarest, 1826)	LC^{IUCN}	West Papua	Green parrot with yellow head, red crown, and blue eye and wing markings
Edwards's fig parrot	P. edwardsii (Oustalet, 1885)	LC^{IUCN}	Northern coast of Papua New Guinea	Green parrot with blue, light blue, red, and yellow head markings
Salvadori's fig parrot	P. salvadorii (Oustalet, 1880)	LC^{IUCN}	Northern coast of Papua Province	

==== Subfamily Agapornithinae ====
Genus Agapornis (lovebirds) Selby, 1836 – nine species
Common name	Scientific name	IUCN Red List Status	Range	Picture
Rosy-faced lovebird	A. roseicollis (Vieillot, 1818)	LC^{IUCN}	Southwestern Africa	Green parrot with pink face and blue tail tips
Yellow-collared lovebird	A. personatus	LC^{IUCN}	Eastern Africa around Tanzania	Green parrot with yellow neck, black head, and red beak
Fischer's lovebird	A. fischeri Reichenow, 1887	iNT^{IUCN}	Eastern Africa around Tanzania	Three green parrots with yellow neck and crown, orange face, and red beak
Lilian's lovebird	A. lilianae Shelley, 1894	iNT^{IUCN}	Southeastern Africa around Malawi	Green parrot with orange chin and face and red forehead
Black-cheeked lovebird	A. nigrigenis Sclater, 1906	gVU^{IUCN}	Southwest Zambia	Two bright green parrots with orange chin, black head, and red beak
Grey-headed lovebird	A. canus (Gmelin, 1788)	LC^{IUCN}	Coast of Madagascar and formerly Comoros	Female left, male right
Black-winged lovebird	A. taranta (Smith-Stanley, 1814)	LC^{IUCN}	Ethiopia and central Eritrea	Green parrot with red crown and orange beak
Red-headed lovebird	A. pullarius (Linnaeus, 1758)	LC^{IUCN}	Sub-Saharan Africa north of the Democratic Republic of the Congo, and around the Gulf of Guinea	Two green parrots with orange faces
Black-collared lovebird	A. swindernianus (Kuhl, 1820)	LC^{IUCN}	West equatorial Africa	Light green parrot with orange chest marking and black neck marking

Genus Loriculus (hanging parrots) Blyth, 1849 – 15 species
Common name	Scientific name	IUCN Red List Status	Range	Picture
Moluccan hanging parrot	L. amabilis Wallace, 1862	LC^{IUCN}	North Maluku	
Orange-fronted hanging parrot	L. aurantiifrons Schlegel, 1871	LC^{IUCN}	New Guinea, excluding the New Guinea Highlands	
Sri Lanka hanging parrot	L. beryllinus (Pennant, 1781)	LC^{IUCN}	Southern Sri Lanka	Green parrot with darker wings and a red crown and beak
Sangihe hanging parrot	L. catamene Schlegel, 1871	iNT^{IUCN}	Sangihe Islands	Female left, male right
Pygmy hanging parrot	L. exilis Schlegel, 1866	iNT^{IUCN}	Sulawesi	
Wallace's hanging parrot	L. flosculus Wallace, 1864	eEN^{IUCN}	Flores	
Blue-crowned hanging parrot	L. galgulus (Linnaeus, 1758)	LC^{IUCN}	Sumatra, Borneo and the Malay Peninsula	Female left, male right
Sula hanging parrot	L. sclateri Wallace, 1863	LC^{IUCN}	Taliabu, Peleng, and smaller, nearby islands	
Great hanging parrot	L. stigmatus (Müller, 1843)	LC^{IUCN}	Sulawesi	
Bismarck hanging parrot	L. tener Sclater, 1877	iNT^{IUCN}	New Britain, New Ireland, and New Hanover	Drawing of two green parrots with red throat and yellow tail
Philippine hanging parrot	L. philippensis (Müller, 1776)	LC^{IUCN}	The Philippines	Female left, male right
Black-billed hanging parrot	L. bonapartei Souancé, 1856		Sulu Archipelago of the Philippines	The front of the crown of the black-billed hanging parrot is red, turning to orange and yellow on the back of the crown. The tail is green above and blue below. Most of its feathers are bright green, its bill is black and its irises are brown
Camiguin hanging parrot	L. camiguinensis Tello, Degner, Bates & Willard, 2006		Camiguin of the Philippines	mostly green with blue throat, face and thighs, and a red tail and red crown. Males and female birds look identical. Only the males of all the other populations living on other islands have a red area on their fronts
Yellow-throated hanging parrot	L. pusillus Gray, 1859	iNT^{IUCN}	Java and Bali	Green parrot with yellow throat
Vernal hanging parrot	L. vernalis (Sparrman, 1787)	LC^{IUCN}	Indochina (excluding the Malay Peninsula), and the Eastern and Western Ghats	Green parrot with darker wings and orange beak

Genus Bolbopsittacus Salvadori 1891 – one species
Common name	Scientific name	IUCN Red List Status	Range	Picture
Guaiabero	B. lunulatus (Scopoli, 1786)	LC^{IUCN}	Philippines, excluding the central islands	Green parrot with yellow-flecked wings and bright blue-green face

==== Subfamily Psittaculinae ====
Tribe Polytelini

Genus Alisterus (king parrots) Mathews, 1911 – three species
Common name	Scientific name	IUCN Red List Status	Range	Picture
Moluccan king parrot	A. amboinensis (Linnaeus, 1766)	LC^{IUCN}	West Papua, Maluku, North Maluku, Buru Island, and the Banggai Islands	Red parrot with green wings and blue back
Australian king parrot	A. scapularis (Lichtenstein, 1818)	LC^{IUCN}	Eastern coast of Australia	Red parrot with green wings
Papuan king parrot	A. chloropterus (Ramsay, 1879)	LC^{IUCN}	New Guinea, excluding West Papua and the New Guinea Highlands	Red parrot with green wings

Genus Aprosmictus Gould, 1842 – two species
Common name	Scientific name	IUCN Red List Status	Range	Picture
Jonquil parrot	A. jonquillaceus (Vieillot, 1818)	iNT^{IUCN}	Timor	
Red-winged parrot	A. erythropterus (Gmelin, 1788)	LC^{IUCN}	Northern Australia and southern Papua New Guinea	Two green parrots, one with red and black wings and one with red and green

Genus Polytelis Wagler, 1832 – three species
Common name	Scientific name	IUCN Red List Status	Range	Picture
Superb parrot	P. swainsonii (Desmarest, 1826)	LC^{IUCN}	Central New South Wales	Green parrot with blue wings, yellow face, and orange chin and beak
Regent parrot	P. anthopeplus (Lear, 1831)	LC^{IUCN}	Southwest Western Australia and southwest New South Wales and northwest Victoria	Two yellow parrots with black tails, wing edges, and backs
Princess parrot	P. alexandrae Gould, 1863	iNT^{IUCN}	Central Australia	Green parrot with grey head, pink throat, yellow back, and dark wing tips

Tribe Psittaculini

Genus Prioniturus (racket-tails) Wagler, 1842 – nine species
Common name	Scientific name	IUCN Red List Status	Range	Picture
Montane racket-tail	P. montanus Ogilvie-Grant, 1895	iNT^{IUCN}	Luzon	Stamp with drawing of two green parrots with yellow chest and orange back, one with blue face and red crown
Mindanao racket-tail	P. waterstradti Rothschild, 1904	iNT^{IUCN}	Mindanao, an island of the Philippines	
Blue-headed racket-tail	P. platenae Blasius, 1888	gVU^{IUCN}	Palawan, an island chain of the Philippines	Green parrot with darker wings
Green racket-tail	P. luconensis Steere, 1890	eEN^{IUCN}	Luzon and Marinduque	
Blue-crowned racket-tail	P. discurus (Vieillot, 1822)	LC^{IUCN}	Central and southern Philippines	Drawing of two green parrots with darker wings, yellow throat, and blue crown and tail tips
Mindoro racket-tail	P. mindorensis Steere, 1890	gVU^{IUCN}	Mindoro, an island of the Philippines	
Blue-winged racket-tail	P. verticalis Sharpe, 1893	CR^{IUCN}	Sulu Archipelago	Drawing of two green parrots with darker wings and blue tail tips, one with a red and blue crown
Yellow-breasted racket-tail	P. flavicans Cassin, 1853	iNT^{IUCN}	Northern Sulawesi	Drawing of a green parrot with yellow shoulders and a blue and red crown
Golden-mantled racket-tail	P. platurus (Vieillot, 1818)	LC^{IUCN}	Sulawesi and the Sula Islands	Drawing of two green parrots, one with orange shoulders and a blue and red crown
Buru racket-tail	P. mada Hartert, 1900	LC^{IUCN}	Buru, Indonesia	Green parrot with yellow under-tail and blue shoulders and crown

Genus Eclectus Wagler, 1832 – five species
Common name	Scientific name	IUCN Red List Status	Range	Male	Female
Moluccan eclectus	E. roratus (Müller, 1776)	LC^{IUCN}	Maluku, North Maluku	Two parrots, one green with orange and yellow bill, one red with blue nape	
Sumba eclectus	E. cornelia Bonaparte, 1850	EN	Sumba		
Tanimbar eclectus	E. riedeli AB Meyer, 1882	VU	Tanimbar Islands		
Papuan eclectus	E. polychloros (Scopoli, 1786)	LC	from Kai Islands and western islands of the West Papua province in the west, across the island of New Guinea to the Trobriands, D'Entrecasteaux Islands, and Louisiade Archipelago		
Oceanic eclectus	†E. infectus Steadman, 2006	aEX^{IUCN}	Formerly Tonga and possibly Malakula until the late 1700s		

Genus Geoffroyus Bonaparte, 1850 – four species
Common name	Scientific name	IUCN Red List Status	Range	Picture
Red-cheeked parrot	G. geoffroyi (Bechstein, 1811)	LC^{IUCN}	New Guinea (excluding the New Guinea Highlands), Maluku, North Maluku, Buru Island, Aru Islands, Timor, and the Lesser Sunda Islands	Green parrot with rose cheeks and brow
Blue-collared parrot	G. simplex (Meyer, 1874)	LC^{IUCN}	New Guinea Highlands and West Papua	
Song parrot	G. heteroclitus (Hombron and Jacquinot, 1841)	LC^{IUCN}	New Britain, New Ireland, New Hanover, and the Solomon Islands	
Rennell parrot	G. hyacinthinus (Mayr, 1931)	LC^{IUCN}	Rennell Island, an island of the Solomon Islands	

Genus Tanygnathus Wagler, 1832 – four species
Common name	Scientific name	IUCN Red List Status	Range	Picture
Great-billed parrot	T. megalorynchos (Boddaert, 1783)	LC^{IUCN}	North Maluku, Maluku, Buru Island, Tanimbar Islands, East Nusa Tenggara, and Sumba	Green parrot with blue wing tips and large red beak
Blue-naped parrot	T. lucionensis (Linnaeus, 1766)	iNT^{IUCN}	The Philippines	Green parrot with blue nape and red beak
Blue-backed parrot	T. sumatranus (Raffles, 1822)	LC^{IUCN}	The Philippines, Sulawesi, and Taliabu	Green parrot with blue back and red beak
Black-lored parrot	T. gramineus (Gmelin, 1788)	gVU^{IUCN}	Buru Island	

Genus Psittinus Blyth, 1842 – two species
Common name	Scientific name	IUCN Red List Status	Range	Picture
Blue-rumped parrot	P. cyanurus (Forster, 1795)	iNT^{IUCN}	Borneo, Sumatra, the Mentawai Islands, Bangka Island, Riau Archipelago, the Lingga Islands, and the Malay Peninsula	Dusty green parrot with bright green wings, blue brow, and red beak
Simeulue parrot	P. abbotti Richmond, 1902	iNT^{IUCN}	Simeulue and the Siumat Islands	

Genus Psittacula Cuvier, 1800 – fifteen species
Common name	Scientific name	IUCN Red List Status	Range	Picture
Newton's parakeet	†P. exsul (Newton, 1872)	aEX^{IUCN}	Formerly Rodrigues, an island of Mauritius until 1875	Drawing of blue parrot with darker wings and head
Echo parakeet	P. eques (Boddaert, 1783)	EN^{IUCN}	Southwest corner of Mauritius and formerly Réunion	Green parrot with darker wings
Rose-ringed parakeet	P. krameri (Scopoli, 1769)	LC^{IUCN}	Equatorial Africa, India, Pakistan, Bangladesh, Nepal, and Burma	Green parrot with red beak and pink neck ring
Alexandrine parakeet	P. eupatria (Linnaeus, 1766)	iNT^{IUCN}	Eastern India, Western Ghats, the Himalayas, Indochina, and introduced to Bahrain and southwest Iran	Green parrot with red beak
Seychelles parakeet	†P. wardi (Newton, 1867)	aEX^{IUCN}	Formerly Mahé, Praslin, and Silhouette Island until 1883	Drawing of green parrot with blue neck ring, red beak, and red wing patch
Plum-headed parakeet	P. cyanocephala (Linnaeus, 1766)	LC^{IUCN}	India, Sri Lanka, and the Himalayas	Two light green parrots with green wings, one with red wing patch, blue neck ring, and red head, the other with orange neck ring and grey head
Blossom-headed parakeet	P. roseata Biswas, 1951	iNT^{IUCN}	Indochina (excluding Malaysia) and the eastern Himalayas	
Slaty-headed parakeet	P. himalayana (Lesson, 1831)	LC^{IUCN}	the Himalayas	Green parrot with darker wings, blue nape, and dark grey head
Grey-headed parakeet	P. finschii (Hume, 1874)	iNT^{IUCN}	Indochina, excluding Thailand and Malaysia	Drawing of two green parrots with dark grey head, blue neck ring, and red beaks
Blue-winged parakeet	P. columboides (Vigors, 1830)	LC^{IUCN}	Western Ghats	Female left, male right
Layard's parakeet	P. calthrapae (Blyth, 1849)	LC^{IUCN}	Southern Sri Lanka	Green parrot with grey back, head, and tail
Lord Derby's parakeet	P. derbiana (Fraser, 1852)	iNT^{IUCN}	Southern China near the China/India and China/Myanmar border	Two grey parrots with green back and wings, one with red beak
Red-breasted parakeet	P. alexandri (Linnaeus, 1758)	iNT^{IUCN}	Indochina (excluding central Thailand) and the Himalayas	Two green parrots with red chest and grey heads, one with a red beak
Nicobar parakeet	P. caniceps (Blyth, 1846)	iNT^{IUCN}	Nicobar Islands which is northwest of Sumatra	Drawing of two green parrots with grey heads, one with a blue beak and one with red
Long-tailed parakeet	P. longicauda (Boddaert, 1783)	iNT^{IUCN}	Sumatra, coasts of Borneo, tip of the Malay Peninsula	Green parrot with blue tail, red head, and black crown
Mascarene grey parakeet	†P. bensoni (Note: This parrot is considered a member of the genus Psittacula by the IOC since 2007, but as a member of the genus Lophopsittacus by the IUCN.) (Holyoak, 1973)	aEX^{IUCN}	Formerly Mauritius until 1764	Drawing of a grey parrot with red beak

Genus †Lophopsittacus Cuvier, 1800 – one species
Common name	Scientific name	IUCN Red List Status	Range	Picture
Broad-billed parrot	†L. mauritianus (Owen, 1866)	aEX^{IUCN}	Formerly Mauritius until 1693	Drawing of black parrot

Genus †Necropsittacus Milne-Edwards, 1874 – one species
Common name	Scientific name	IUCN Red List Status	Range	Picture
Rodrigues parrot	†N. rodricanus (Milne-Edwards, 1867)	aEX^{IUCN}	Formerly Rodrigues, an island of Mauritius, until 1761	

Tribe Micropsittini

Genus Micropsitta (pygmy parrots) Lesson, 1831 – six species
Common name	Scientific name	IUCN Red List Status	Range	Picture
Buff-faced pygmy parrot	M. pusio (Sclater, 1866)	LC^{IUCN}	Northern coast of New Guinea, coast of the Papuan Peninsula, and the southern islands of the Bismarck Archipelago	Drawing of green parrot with orange head and black and blue tail tips
Yellow-capped pygmy parrot	M. keiensis (Salvadori, 1876)	LC^{IUCN}	Southern New Guinea, the Aru Islands, coast of West Papua, and the Raja Ampat Islands	Drawing of green parrot with yellow cheeks and yellow tail with black markings
Geelvink pygmy parrot	M. geelvinkiana (Schlegel, 1871)	iNT^{IUCN}	Biak-Supiori and Numfor (islands of the Baik Island)	Drawing of two green parrots with orange faces and blue crowns, one with orange chest
Meek's pygmy parrot	M. meeki Rothschild and Hartert, 1914	LC^{IUCN}	Admiralty Islands and the St Matthias Islands	
Finsch's pygmy parrot	M. finschii (Ramsay, 1881)	LC^{IUCN}	Solomon Islands and New Ireland	
Red-breasted pygmy parrot	M. bruijnii (Salvadori, 1875)	LC^{IUCN}	New Guinea Highlands, New Britain, New Ireland, Bougainville Island, Kolombangara Island, Guadalcanal, West Papua, and Maruku	

=== Family Psittrichasiidae ===
==== Subfamily Coracopsinae ====
Genus Coracopsis (vasa parrots) Wagler, 1832 – three species
Common name	Scientific name	IUCN Red List Status	Range	Picture
Greater vasa parrot	C. vasa (Shaw, 1812)	LC^{IUCN}	The coasts of Madagascar and Comoros (excluding Mayotte)	A brown parrot
Lesser vasa parrot	C. nigra (Linnaeus, 1758)	LC^{IUCN}	Madagascar	A brown parrot with blue-tipped wings
Seychelles black parrot	C. barklyi Newton, 1867	gVU^{IUCN}	Praslin and possibly Curieuse Island	A brown parrot

==== Subfamily Psittrichasinae ====
Genus Psittrichas Lesson, 1831 – one species
Common name	Scientific name	IUCN Red List Status	Range	Picture
Pesquet's parrot	P. fulgidus (Lesson, 1830)	gVU^{IUCN}	New Guinea Highlands	A blue-grey parrot with a red underside and wing tips

== See also ==
- List of macaws
- List of amazon parrots
- List of Nestoridae
- List of Aratinga parakeets
