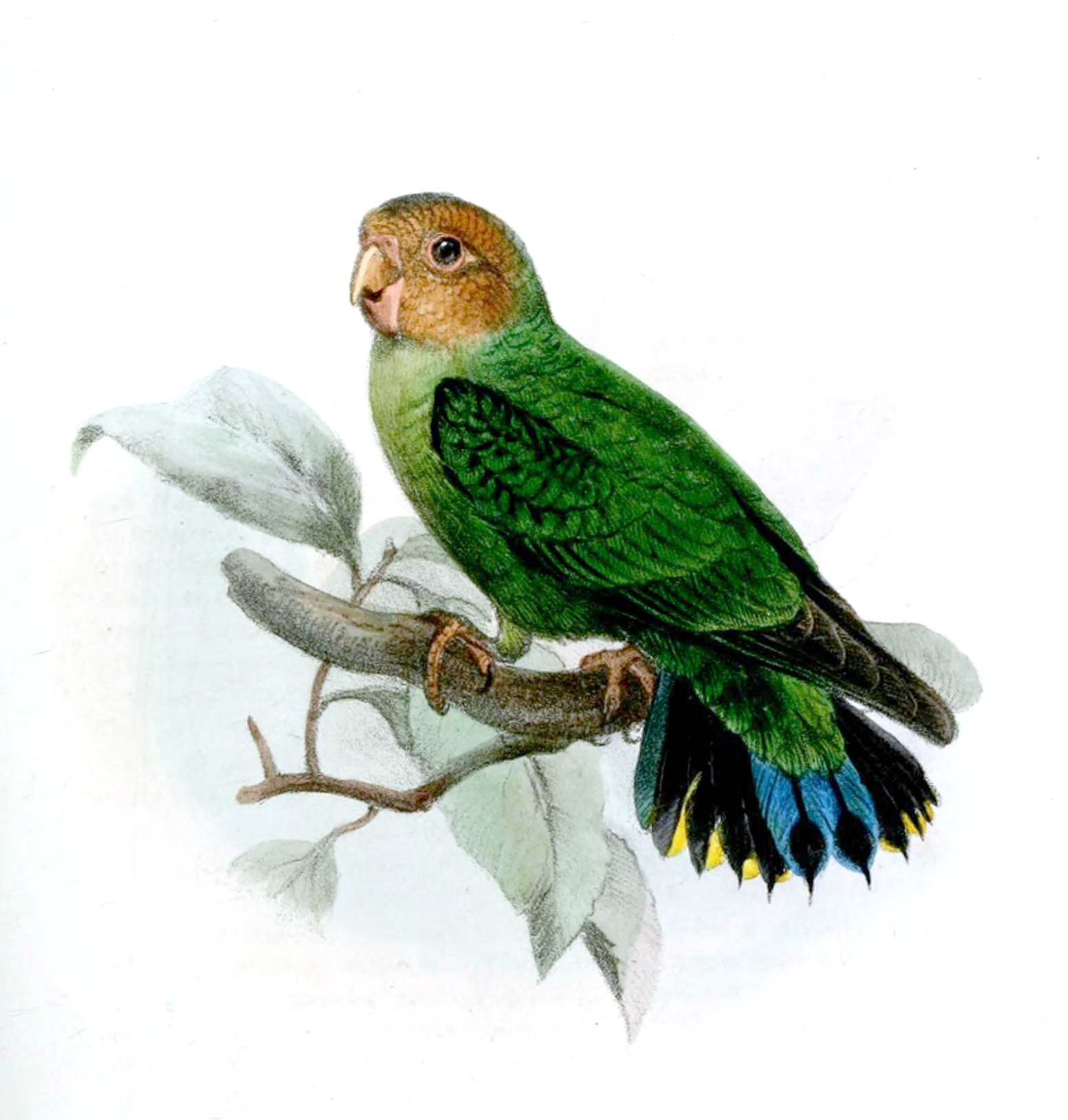

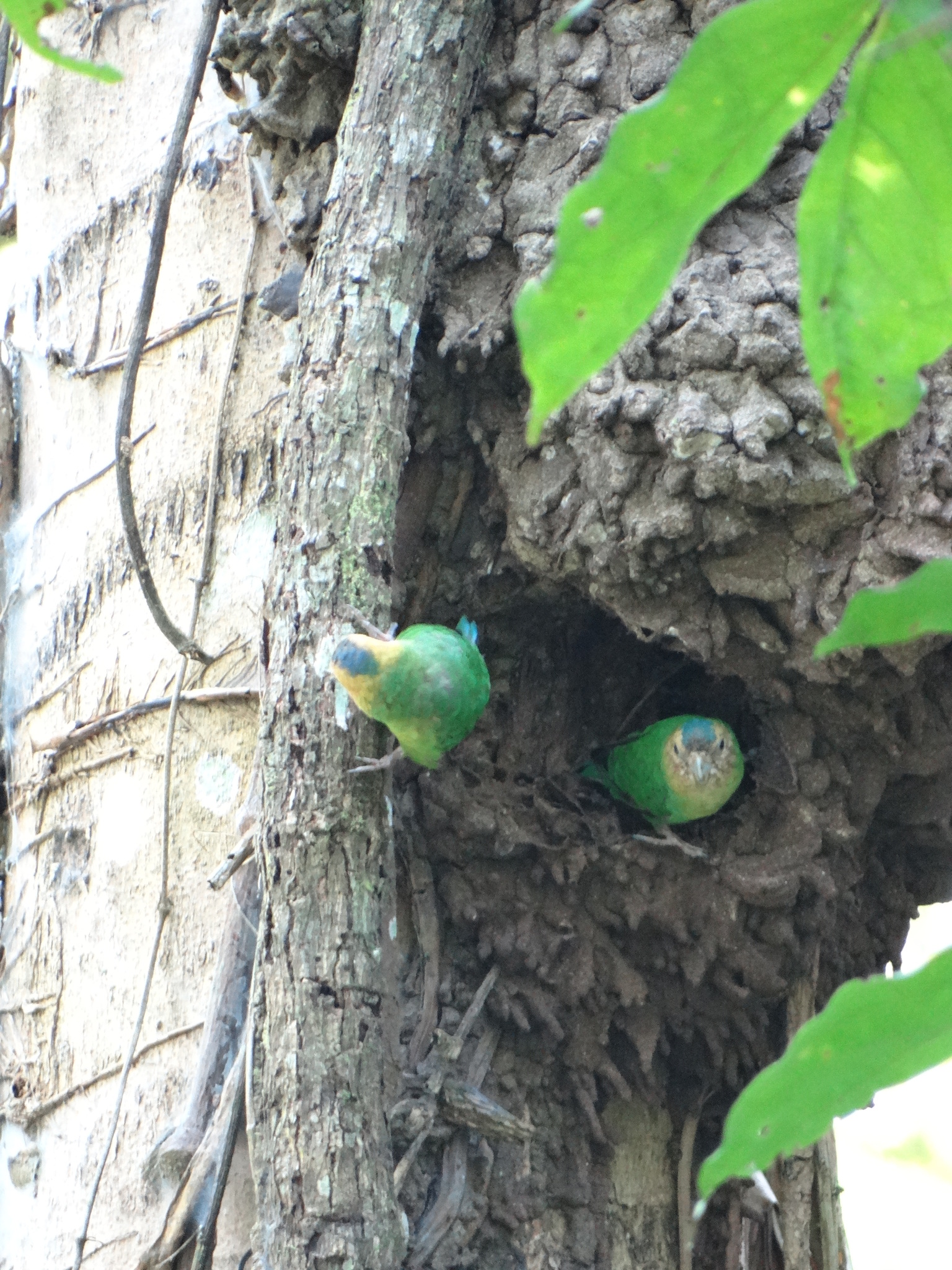

Conservation status
- Least Concern (IUCN 3.1)

Scientific classification
- Kingdom: Animalia
- Phylum: Chordata
- Class: Aves
- Order: Psittaciformes
- Family: Psittaculidae
- Genus: Micropsitta
- Species: M. pusio

Binomial name
- Micropsitta pusio (Sclater, PL, 1866)

= Buff-faced pygmy parrot =

Species of bird

The buff-faced pygmy parrot (Micropsitta pusio) is a very small green parrot found in subtropical or tropical moist lowland forest in New Britain and New Guinea.

== Taxonomy ==
The species was first described as Nasiterna pusio by English naturalist Philip Lutley Sclater in 1866. The genus name Micropsitta is derived from the Greek μικρός mikros meaning small and ψιττακός psittakos for parrot. The specific name is the Latin pūsiō, which means "little boy".

Four subspecies have been described, although their status has been questioned. The type subspecies, M. p. pusio, occurs on the Bismarck Archipelago and southeastern New Guinea; birds of Fergusson Island in the D'Entrecasteaux Archipelago have blue-tinged throats and less distinct markings and are described as M. p. harterti; birds of Misima and Tagula Islands in the Louisiade Archipelago are slightly larger and have more yellowish underparts and are described as subspecies M. p. stresemanni; and those that range in western New Guinea from Cenderawasih Bay to the Kumusi River have darker plumage overall and are named subspecies M. p. beccarii.

== Description ==
Little-studied as an individual species, it is known mainly for being the world's smallest parrot, at 11.5 g (0.41 oz) and 8.6 cm (3.4 in). However, the average weight of six adults was surprisingly high at 14 g (0.49 oz), being slightly higher than two other pygmy parrots, the Geelvink and yellow-capped, both of which, nonetheless, have slightly longer total lengths. The male and female are similar in appearance; their plumage is mainly green with a yellowish tone on the underparts. The cheeks, face, and crown are buff (hence the common name). A dark blue patch is on the top of the head back to the occiput. Head markings are smaller in females, and facial colour is paler. The eyes are dark brown and the bill is grey, and legs are greyish with blue or pinkish tints. Immature birds lack the blue crown, replacing it with green, and the buff colour is less distinct.

== Distribution and habitat ==
Buff-faced pygmy parrots are found across the northern lowlands of the island of New Guinea from the west to the southeastern tip up to an altitude around 800 m, as well as in the Bismarck Archipelago. They inhabit subtropical or tropical moist lowland forest in small groups up to six birds and are highly active, hopping around on tree trunks.

=== Conservation status ===
While its population size is unknown, the species occurs over a very wide range and is listed as least concern by the IUCN.
