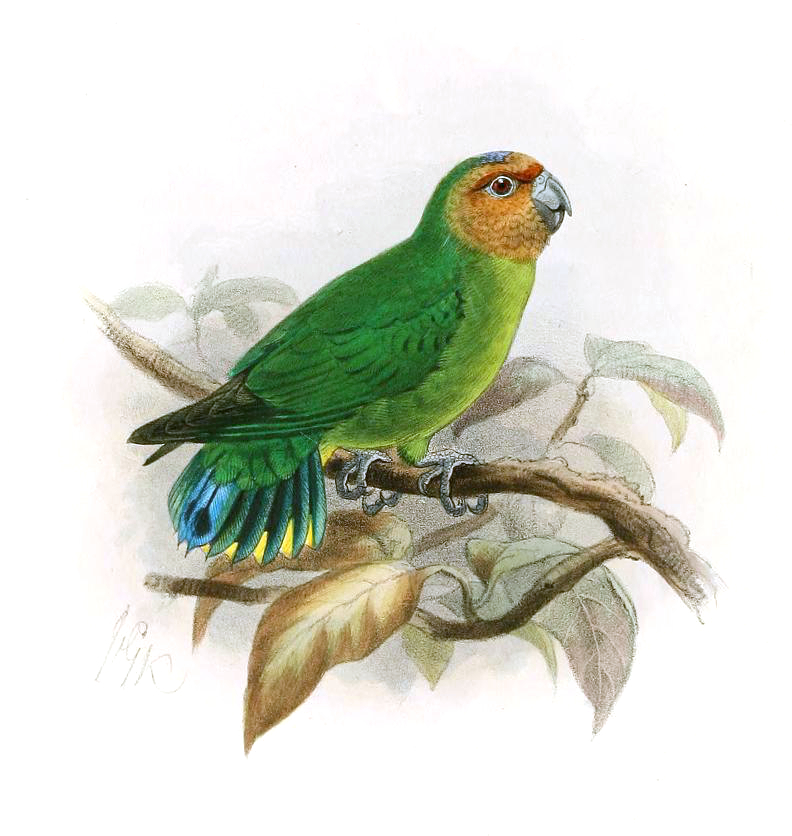
- M. pusio

Scientific classification
- Kingdom: Animalia
- Phylum: Chordata
- Class: Aves
- Order: Psittaciformes
- Family: Psittaculidae
- Subfamily: Psittaculinae
- Genus: Micropsitta; Lesson, 1831

Species
- Micropsitta pusio Micropsitta keiensis Micropsitta geelvinkiana Micropsitta meeki Micropsitta finschii Micropsitta bruijnii

= Pygmy parrot =

Genus of birds

Pygmy parrots are the smallest members of the parrot order. The six species of pygmy parrots are all in the genus Micropsitta, which is the only genus in the Micropsittini tribe.

Pygmy parrots are native to the forests of New Guinea and nearby islands. They are tiny birds, fast-moving, and mostly green with bright highlights. A pygmy parrot spends a good deal of time climbing through foliage, using its large feet and beak, and stiffened tail feathers. At a little over 8 cm (3.1 in) long, the buff-faced pygmy parrot is the smallest parrot species.

Pygmy parrots are also among the few species in the order (other examples include Pyrilia , Nannopsittaca and certain "Agapornis" species) that have never been successfully kept, let alone bred, in captivity. All attempts to do so have resulted in the quick deaths of the little birds. Stress and dietary deficiencies are probably to blame. Pygmy parrots are among the few birds that feed on fungi and lichens, which play a major role in their diet. Their precise dietary needs are poorly understood.

== Description ==
Pygmy parrots are the smallest parrots and range is size from about 8 to 10 cm (3.1 to 3.9 in). They have long toes and long, curved claws. The shafts of their tail feathers are stiff and form projections at the end of the tail. The cere is prominent. The external appearance of the adult males and adult females differ to varying extents in different species. Juveniles are duller.

== Taxonomy ==
The genus was defined by French naturalist René-Primevère Lesson in 1831. The name Micropsitta is derived from the Greek mikros meaning small and psitta for parrot.

The pygmy parrots consist of six species and several subspecies:

Genus: Micropsitta Lesson 1831 (pygmy parrots)

Genus Micropsitta – Lesson, 1831 – six species
Common name	Scientific name and subspecies	Range	Size and ecology	IUCN status and estimated population
Red-breasted pygmy parrot	Micropsitta bruijnii (Salvadori, 1875) Five subspecies: M. b. bruijnii (Salvadori 1875); M. b. buruensis Arndt 1999; M. b. necopinata Hartert 1925; M. b. pileata Mayr 1940; M. b. rosea Mayr 1940	the Maluku Islands and Melanesia.	Size: Habitat: Diet:	LC
Finsch's pygmy parrot	Micropsitta finschii (Ramsay, EP, 1881) Five subspecies: M. f. aolae (Ogilvie-Grant 1888); M. f. finschii (Ramsay, EP 1881); M. f. nanina (Tristram 1891); M. f. tristrami (Rothschild & Hartert 1902); M. f. viridifrons (Rothschild & Hartert 1899)	Papua New Guinea, the Solomon Islands, and the Bismarck Archipelago.	Size: Habitat: Diet:	LC
Geelvink pygmy parrot	Micropsitta geelvinkiana (Schlegel, 1871) Two subspecies: M. g. geelvinkiana (Schlegel 1871); M. g. misoriensis (Salvadori 1876)	Biak and Numfoor islands in Western New Guinea	Size: Habitat: Diet:	LC
Yellow-capped pygmy parrot	Micropsitta keiensis (Salvadori, 1876) Three subspecies: M. k. chloroxantha Oberholser 1917; M. k. keiensis (Salvadori 1876); M. k. viridipectus (Rothschild 1911)	western New Guinea	Size: Habitat: Diet:	LC
Meek's pygmy parrot	Micropsitta meeki Rothschild & Hartert, 1914 Two subspecies: M. m. meeki Rothschild & Hartert 1914; M. m. proxima Rothschild & Hartert 1924	Papua New Guinea.	Size: Habitat: Diet:	LC
Buff-faced pygmy parrot	Micropsitta pusio (Sclater, PL, 1866) Four subspecies: M. p. beccarii (Salvadori 1876); M. p. harterti Mayr 1940; M. p. pusio (Sclater, PL 1866); M. p. stresemanni Hartert 1926	New Britain and New Guinea.	Size: Habitat: Diet:	LC
