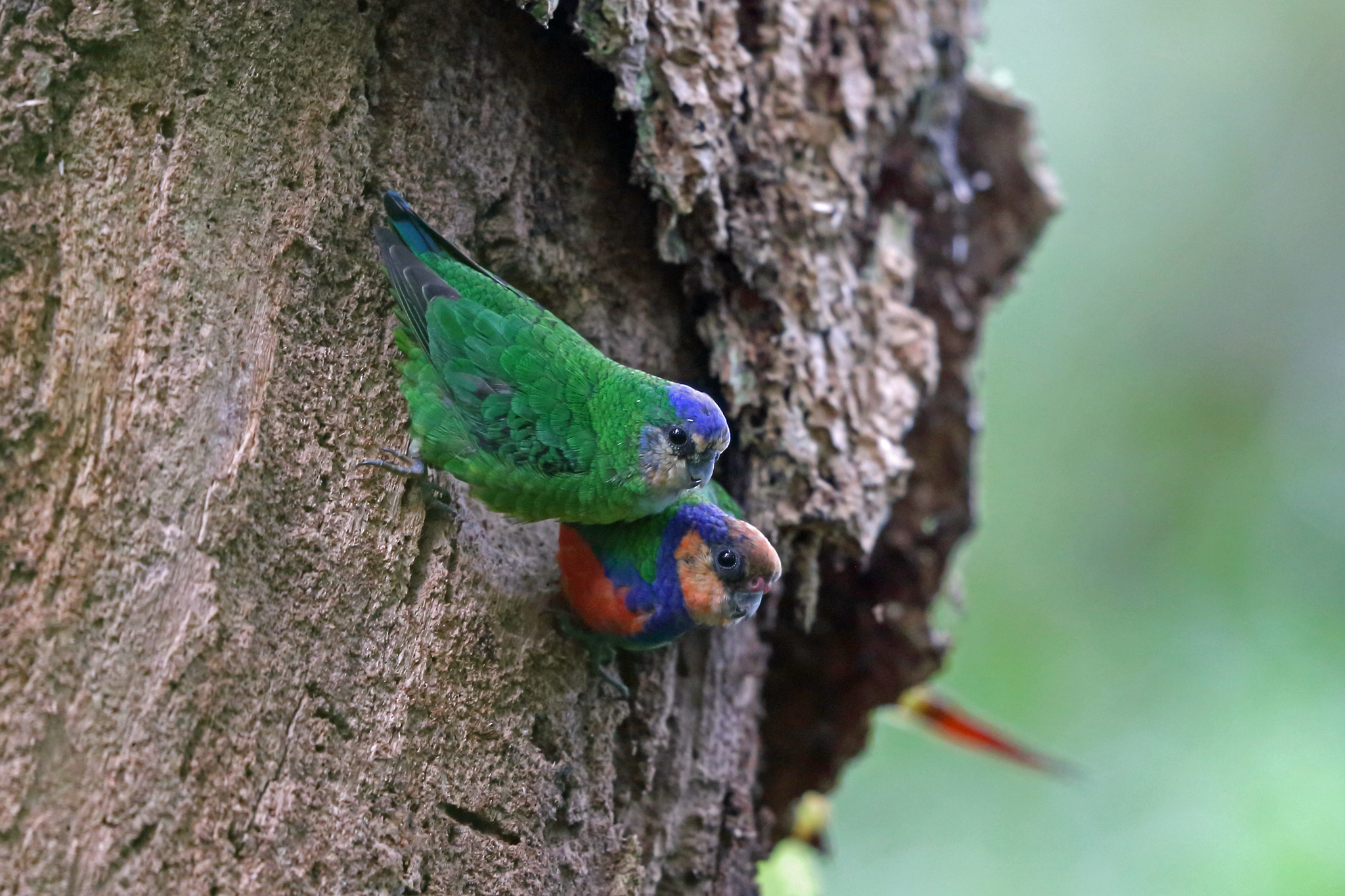
- In Indonesia

Conservation status
- Least Concern (IUCN 3.1)

Scientific classification
- Kingdom: Animalia
- Phylum: Chordata
- Class: Aves
- Order: Psittaciformes
- Family: Psittaculidae
- Genus: Micropsitta
- Species: M. bruijnii

Binomial name
- Micropsitta bruijnii (Salvadori, 1875)

= Red-breasted pygmy parrot =

Species of bird

The red-breasted pygmy parrot (Micropsitta bruijnii) is a species of parrot in the family Psittaculidae. Its natural habitat is the boreal forests, subtropical or tropical dry forests, and subtropical or tropical moist lowland forests of the Maluku Islands and Melanesia.

As their name suggests, the pygmy parrots are the smallest genus of all parrots, with distribution confined to islands off South-east Asia. This particular species is found at higher altitudes than other pygmy parrots, and uses trees rather than arboreal termite nests as breeding sites. They have jerky movements, rather reminiscent of nuthatches (Sitta species), and cling close to the bark as they search for lichens growing in the trees, which form the majority of their diet. Red-breasted pygmy parrots are only 8 cm (3 in) in length.

The global population size has not been quantified, but the species is reported to be common to uncommon due to deforestation and habitat lost on this limited range. It is best to study these birds in their natural habitat because they do not thrive in captivity.

The specific name bruijnii commemorates the Dutch plume merchant Antonie Augustus Bruijn.

== Subspecies ==
The species has five subspecies:

- M. b. bruijnii - mountains of New Guinea
- M. b. buruensis - Buru
- M. b. necopinata - New Britain and New Ireland
- M. b. pileata - Seram
- M. b. rosea - Bougainville, Guadalcanal and Kolambangara in the Solomon Islands

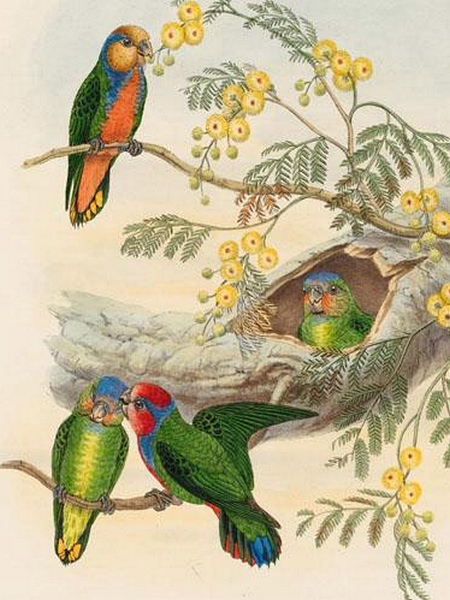
illustration
