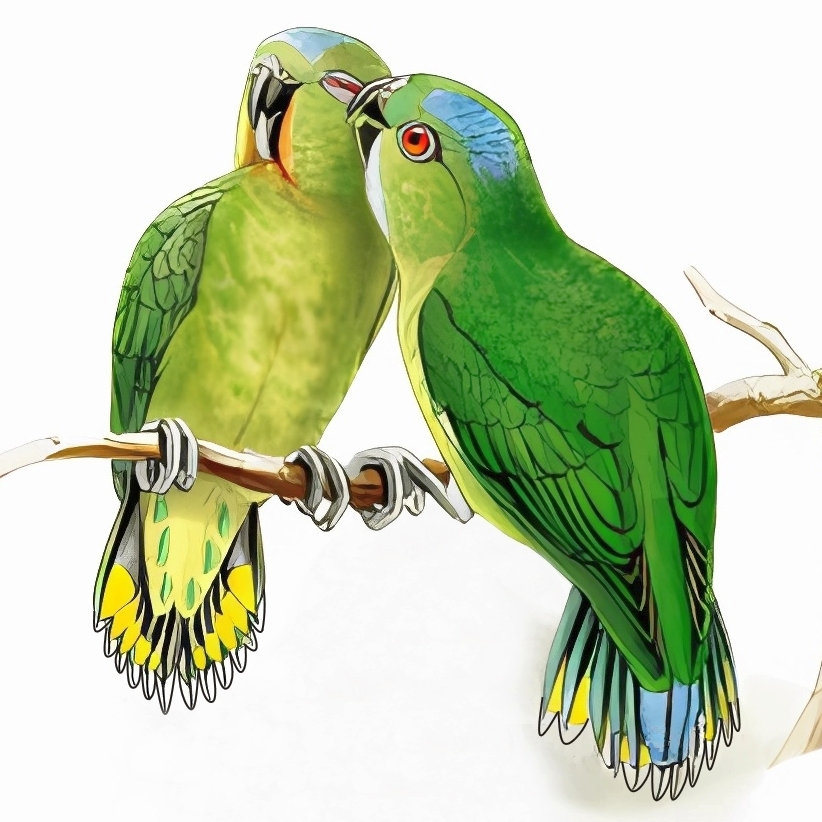

Conservation status
- Least Concern (IUCN 3.1)

Scientific classification
- Kingdom: Animalia
- Phylum: Chordata
- Class: Aves
- Order: Psittaciformes
- Family: Psittaculidae
- Genus: Micropsitta
- Species: M. finschii

Binomial name
- Micropsitta finschii (Ramsay, 1881)
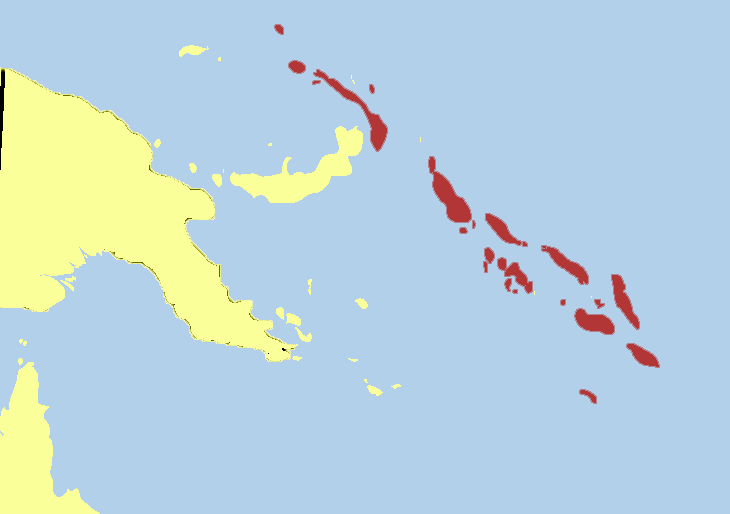
- Range in red

= Finsch's pygmy parrot =

Species of bird

Finsch's pygmy parrot (Micropsitta finschii), also known as the emerald pygmy parrot and green pygmy parrot, is a member of parrot family Psittaculidae inhabiting tropical rainforest regions of islands in Papua New Guinea, the Solomon Islands, and the Bismarck Archipelago.

The common name and scientific name commemorate the German ethnographer, naturalist, and colonial explorer Friedrich Hermann Otto Finsch .

== Description ==
Finsch's pygmy parrot is characterized by a green head and neck (which is unique among species of the genus Micropsitta). The typical length of a green pygmy parrot is 9.5 cm (3.7 in) with an average weight of 12 g (0.42 oz). Male and female individuals can be identified by slight differences in coloration. For example, in one subspecies, males possess a blue patch around the lower section of the beak, whereas the female's patch is pink. The five recognized subspecies each inhabit a different range within the overall distribution of the species and each has different characteristics between sexes.

== Taxonomy ==
Finsch's pygmy parrot is a member of the genus Micropsitta (pygmy parrots). Genus Micropsitta is included in the subfamily Psittacinae (true parrots and allies) of the family Psittacidae (true parrots). The species, Micropsitta finschii, is further divided into five subspecies

- M. f. aolae is found in Guadalcanal, Malaita, Florida (island, not state), and Russell (central Solomon Islands). Adults have a darker green upper body and have a blue patch on the crown.
- M. f. finschii is found in Ugi, San Cristobal, and Rennell (southern Solomon Islands). Males have blue around the lower mandible (beak) and an orange patch in the center of the abdomen. Females lack the orange patch, and have pink feathers around the lower mandible.
- M. f. nanina is found in Santa Isabel, Bugotu, and Choiseul (northern Solomon Islands), as well as in Bougainville Island. Adults have a blue patch on the crown.
- M. f. tristrami is found in Vella Lavella, Gizo, Kolombangara, New Georgia, Rubiana, and Rendova (in the western Solomon Islands). Adults have no blue patches or orange abdominal patches.
- M. f. viridifrons is found in Lihir and Tabar, New Hanover, New Ireland, and in the Bismarck Archipelago (in eastern Papua New Guinea). Adults have a large blue patch on the crown, as well as blue around the sides of the face.

== Habitat ==
The parrots are found in tropical rainforests (up to an elevation of 900 m (3,000 ft)). The birds are most often observed in the forest interior and in river edge vegetation. They are arboreal and have been observed nesting in old arboreal ant/termite mounds. The birds construct a tunnel into the mound, which is used also as a roost. The birds are described as being abundant in their habitats.

== Behaviour ==
=== Diet ===
The birds find food by climbing tree bark vertically or by climbing along the bottom of branches while hanging upside-down. While foraging and feeding, the tail feathers are used as a prop against the tree surface. The parrot feeds on fungi and lichens found on the tree bark, as well as the seeds of the casuarina tree in which it is commonly found. Some birds apparently associate with slow-moving mixed bird flocks.

=== Vocalizations ===
The song of Finsch's pygmy parrot is a series of repeated whistles. Each whistle consists of a "tweet-tweet" sound, where the second "tweet" is prolonged and is higher in pitch. Other sounds produced include shrill squawking and chattering.

=== Reproduction ===
Finsch's pygmy parrots are often found in pairs or small groups (three to six individuals). The groups often include socially monogamous (for up to a year) mating pairs. The breeding season is from March to May, and a typical clutch has one or two eggs. Both parents provide care for the altricial offspring, and parent-offspring interactions are often prolonged. Information on specific incubation times and chick-rearing times is unavailable, as captive individuals have a low survival rate.
