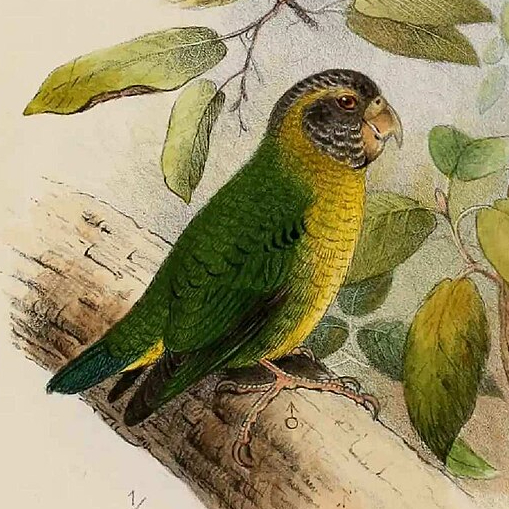

Conservation status
- Least Concern (IUCN 3.1)

Scientific classification
- Kingdom: Animalia
- Phylum: Chordata
- Class: Aves
- Order: Psittaciformes
- Family: Psittaculidae
- Genus: Micropsitta
- Species: M. meeki

Binomial name
- Micropsitta meeki Rothschild & Hartert, 1914

= Meek's pygmy parrot =

Species of bird

Meek's pygmy parrot (Micropsitta meeki), also known as the yellow-breasted pigmy parrot, is a species of small parrot in the family Psittacidae. It is endemic to Papua New Guinea.

== Taxonomy and etymology ==
This bird is one of seven named in honour of the English naturalist Albert Stewart Meek, who collected many previously unknown birds and insects from Australia, Papua New Guinea, and the Pacific region. Many of these are now in the Natural History Museum in London.

The two subspecies are M. m. meeki Rothschild & Hartert, 1914, and M. m. proxima Rothschild & Hartert, 1924.

== Description ==
Pygmy parrots are the smallest members of the true parrots superfamily. They are fast-moving, emerald-green birds with brilliant flashes of colour. Meek's pygmy parrot has a cap, forehead, nape, and face of mid-brown with a yellow throat and underparts. In M. m. meeki, the yellow colouring extends to the ear coverts, while in M. m. proxima, it also extends as a narrowing band of yellow horizontally above the eyes. In the latter subspecies, the face and nape are a paler brown. The remainder of the plumage is green, slightly darker on the back and wings, and paler on the belly. The beak and large feet are brown.

== Distribution ==
Meek's pygmy parrot is known from the Admiralty Islands, a group of eighteen islands in the Bismarck Archipelago to the north of Papua New Guinea. It is said to be common on the islands of Lou and Manus and the population appears to be stable so it is listed as being of "Least Concern" in the IUCN Red List of Threatened Species.

== Biology ==
Meek's pygmy parrots have not been much studied. They spend their day clambering about among the foliage of trees using their beaks, large feet, and stiffened tail feathers for support. Their diet is believed to be insects, fungi, lichens, and mosses. Attempts to keep pygmy parrots in captivity have not met with success. This may be due to the birds suffering from stress or to a lack of understanding of their dietary requirements.
