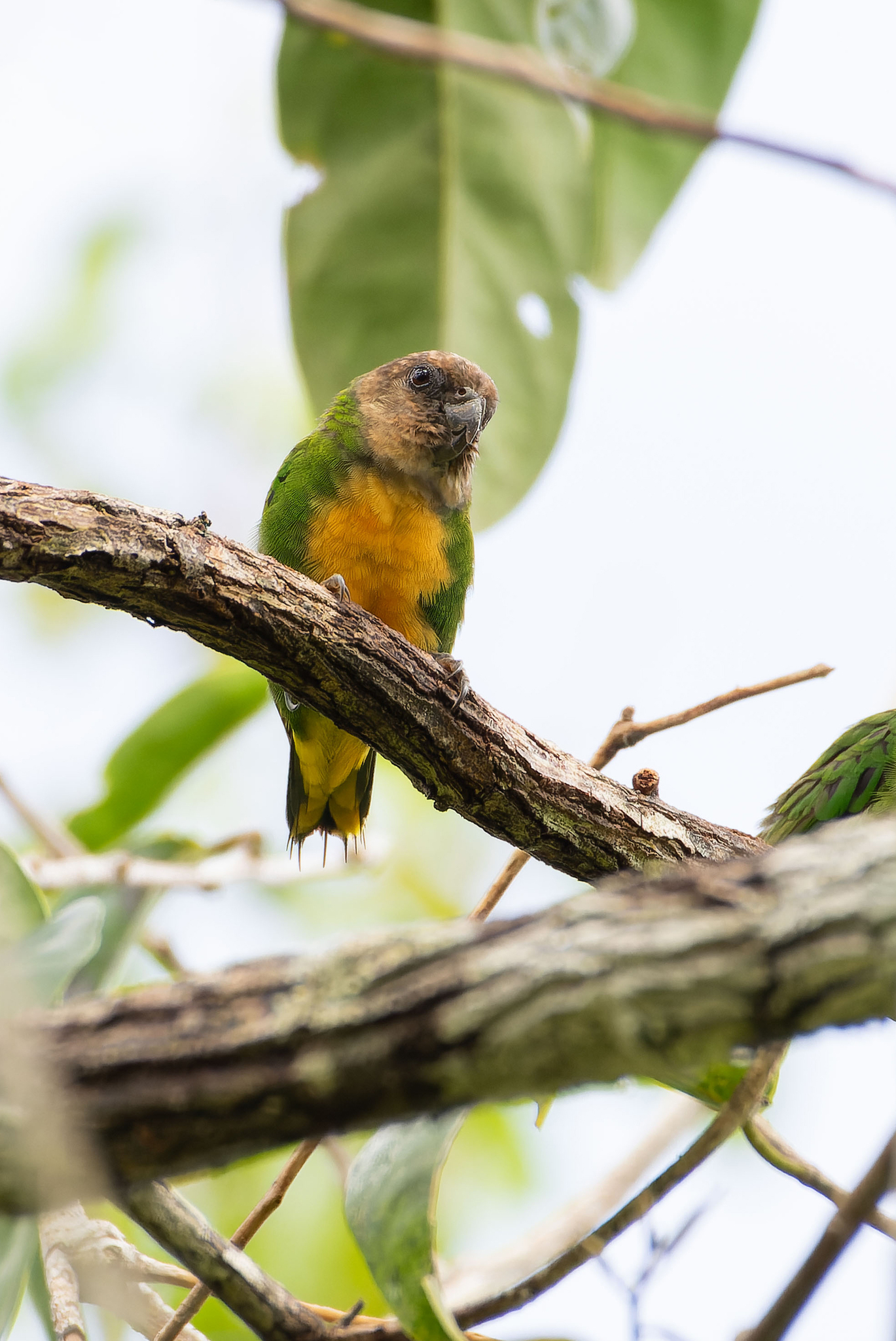

Conservation status
- Least Concern (IUCN 3.1)

Scientific classification
- Kingdom: Animalia
- Phylum: Chordata
- Class: Aves
- Order: Psittaciformes
- Family: Psittaculidae
- Genus: Micropsitta
- Species: M. geelvinkiana

Binomial name
- Micropsitta geelvinkiana (Schlegel, 1871)

= Geelvink pygmy parrot =

Species of bird

The Geelvink pygmy parrot (Micropsitta geelvinkiana) is a species of parrot in the family Psittacidae endemic to Biak and Numfoor islands in Western New Guinea. The name Geelvink comes from a Dutch ship and family called Geelvinck. It has two subspecies; the nominate occurs on Numfor, and M. g. misoriensis on Biak.

== Description ==
It has a brown head, blue crown, light blue ear covert, yellow breast, green body and blue tail. It has red eyes. The female has less brown than the male.

== Diet ==
It feeds on lichen, fungi, seeds, fruits, flowers, insects and their larvae.

== Habitat ==
Its natural habitats are subtropical or tropical moist lowland forests and rural gardens. It is threatened by habitat loss.
