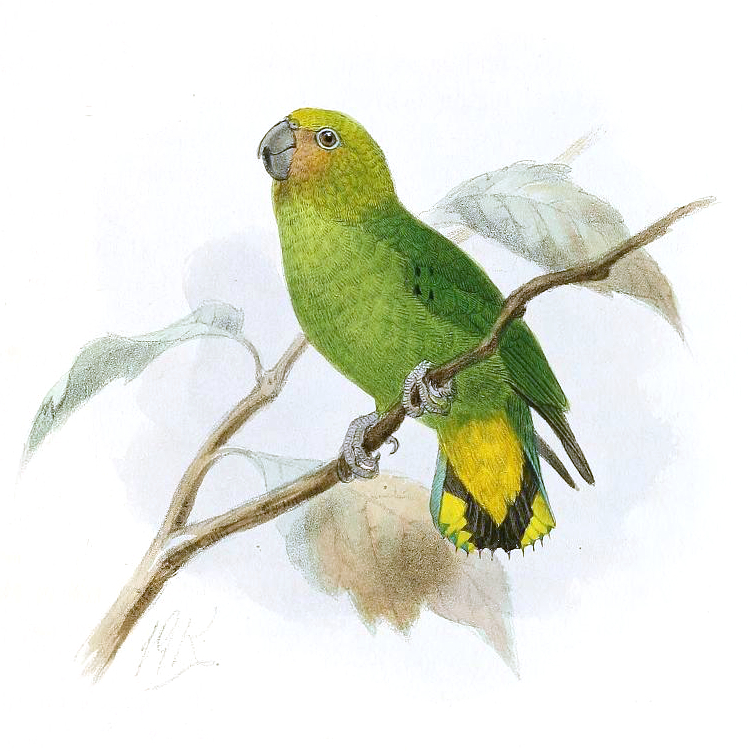
- Female; illustration by Keulemans

Conservation status
- Least Concern (IUCN 3.1)

Scientific classification
- Kingdom: Animalia
- Phylum: Chordata
- Class: Aves
- Order: Psittaciformes
- Family: Psittaculidae
- Genus: Micropsitta
- Species: M. keiensis

Binomial name
- Micropsitta keiensis (Salvadori, 1876)

= Yellow-capped pygmy parrot =

Species of bird

The yellow-capped pygmy parrot (Micropsitta keiensis) is a species of parrot in the family Psittacidae mainly found throughout western New Guinea. Its natural habitats are subtropical or tropical moist lowland forest, subtropical or tropical mangrove forests, and subtropical or tropical moist montane forest. Like many parrots, this pygmy parrot is affectionate to its mate. It is currently unknown if they remain monogamous for life like many bigger parrots because of their isolated location, which is difficult to reach.

== Description ==
Adults of both sexes are green, have a yellow crown and undertail coverts, blue central tail feathers and brown eyes. It has three subspecies: the nominate (M. k. keiensis), M. k. chloroxantha and M. k. viridipectus. Juveniles of M. k. keiensis are generally duller in color; the other subspecies are as in adults. Generally, they are approximately 9.5 cm (3.7 in) long and 11-14 g (0.4-0.5 oz) in weight. It is the smallest species of parrot.

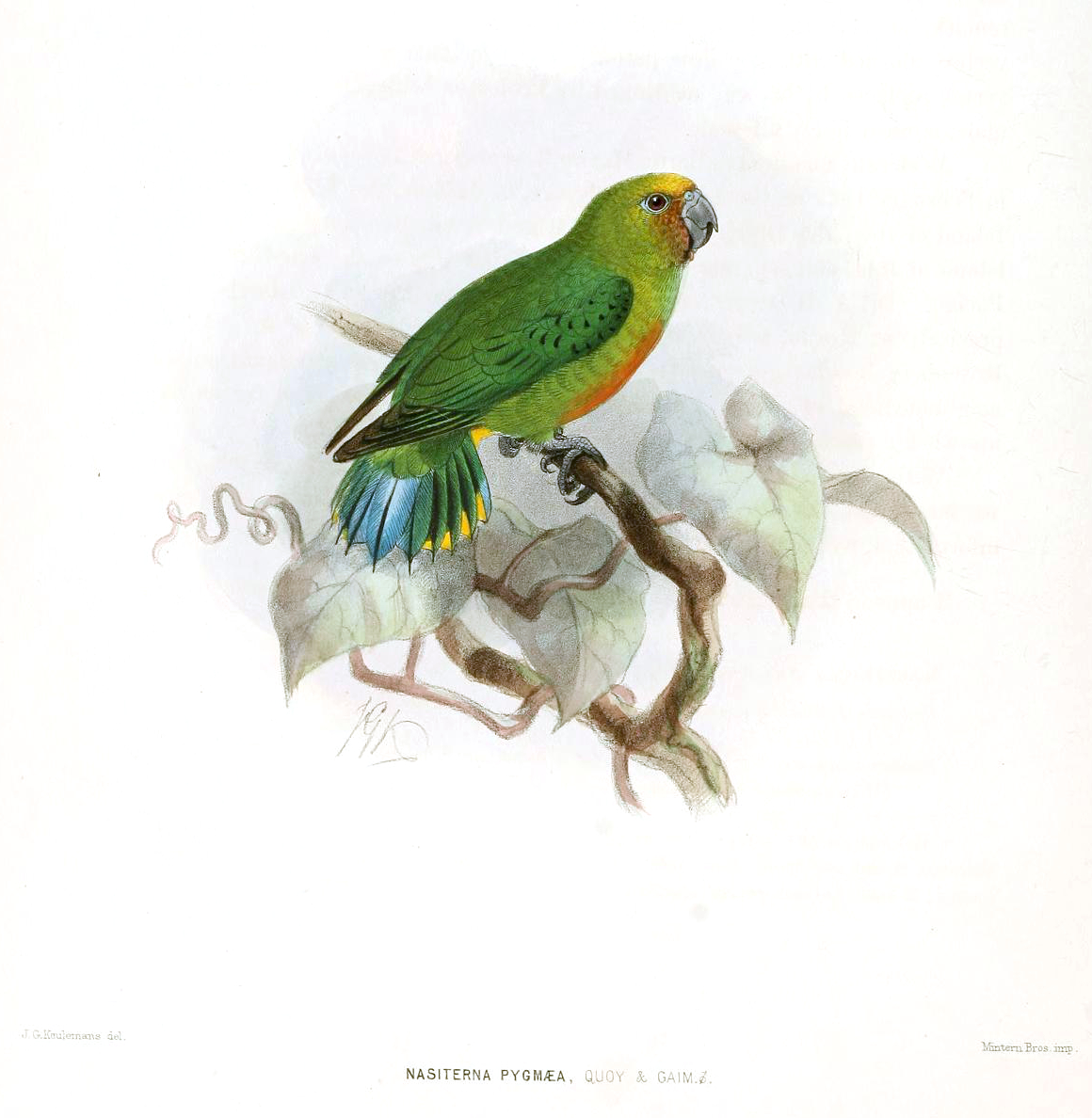
Male; illustration by Keulemans

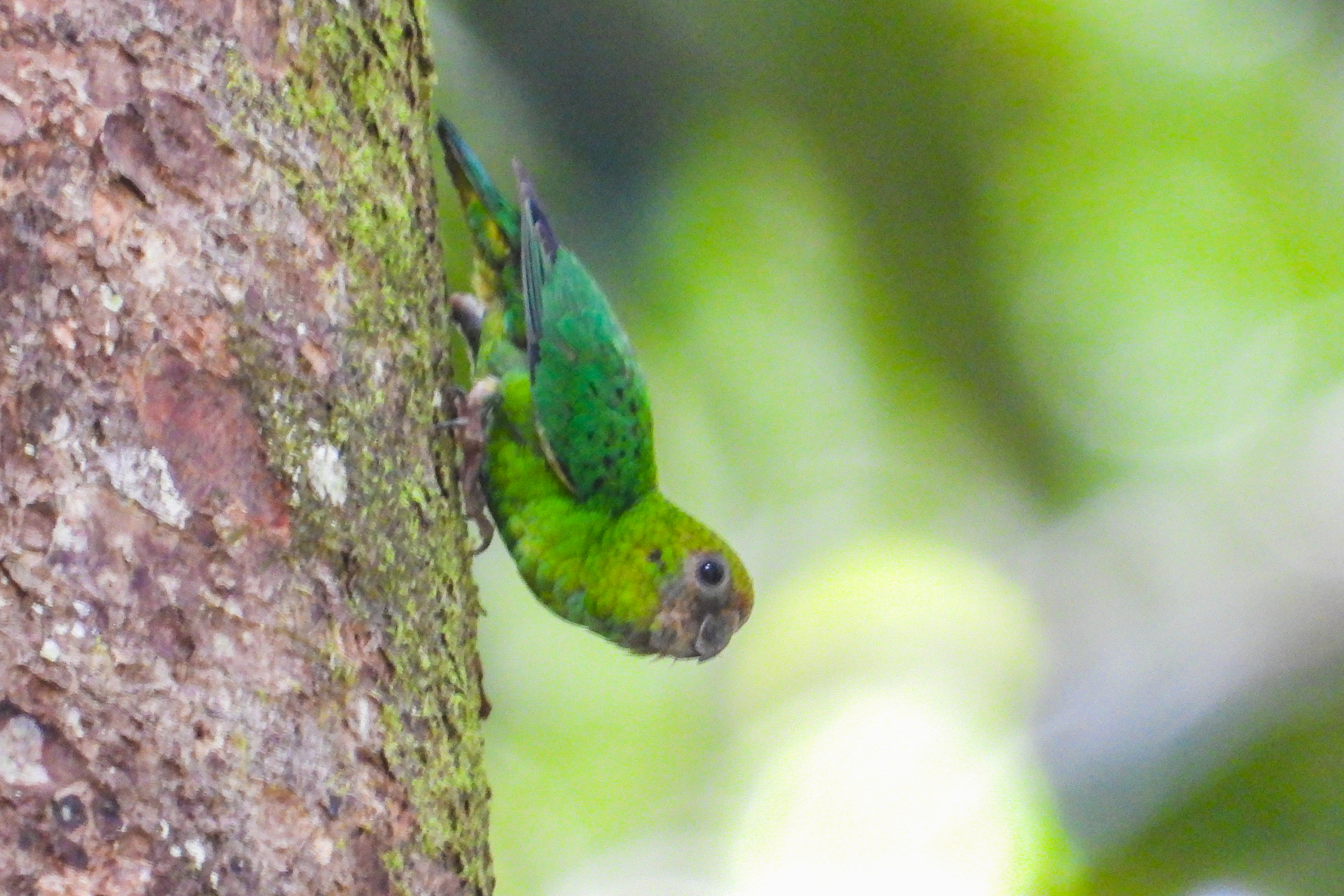
in Indonesia
