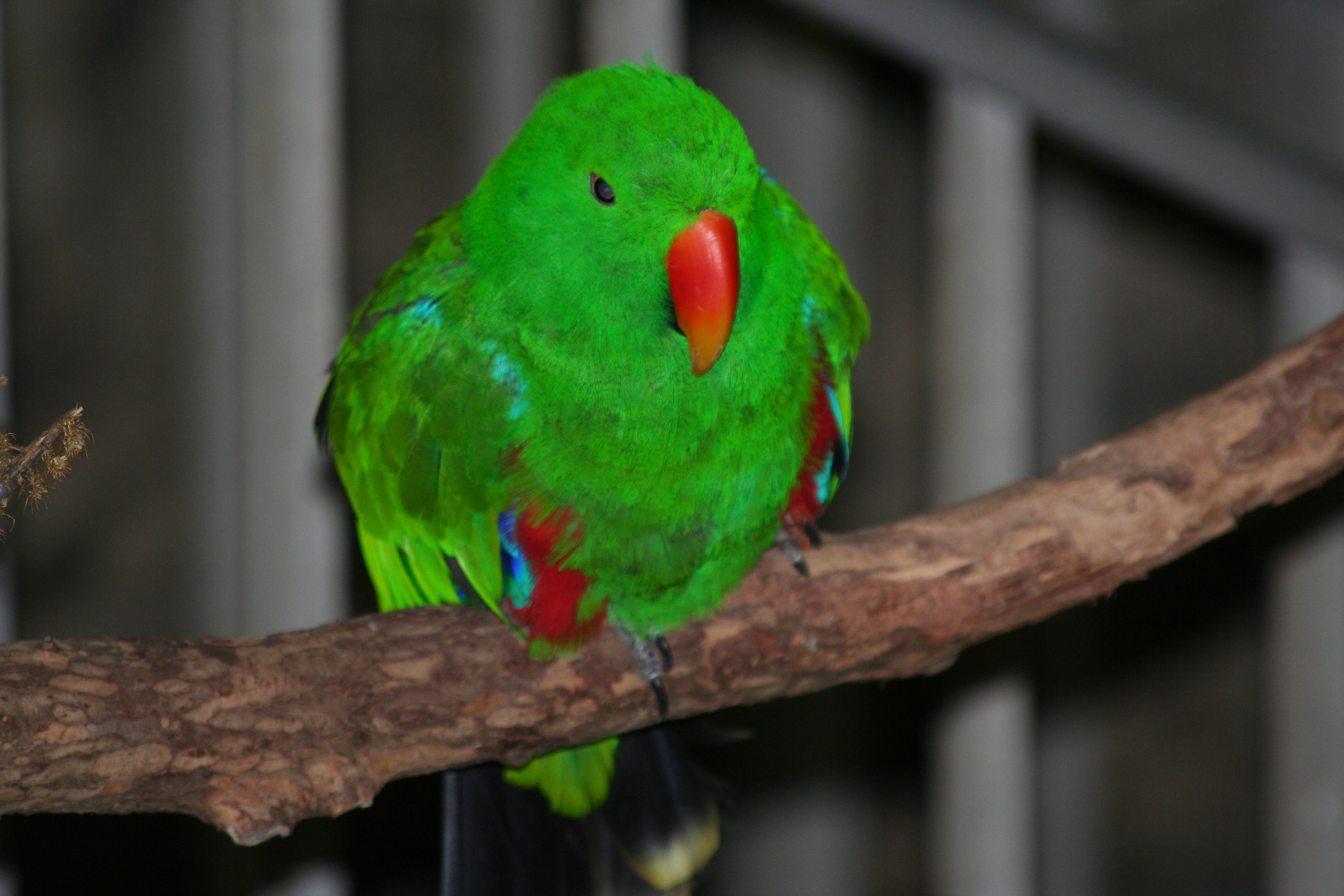
- Male
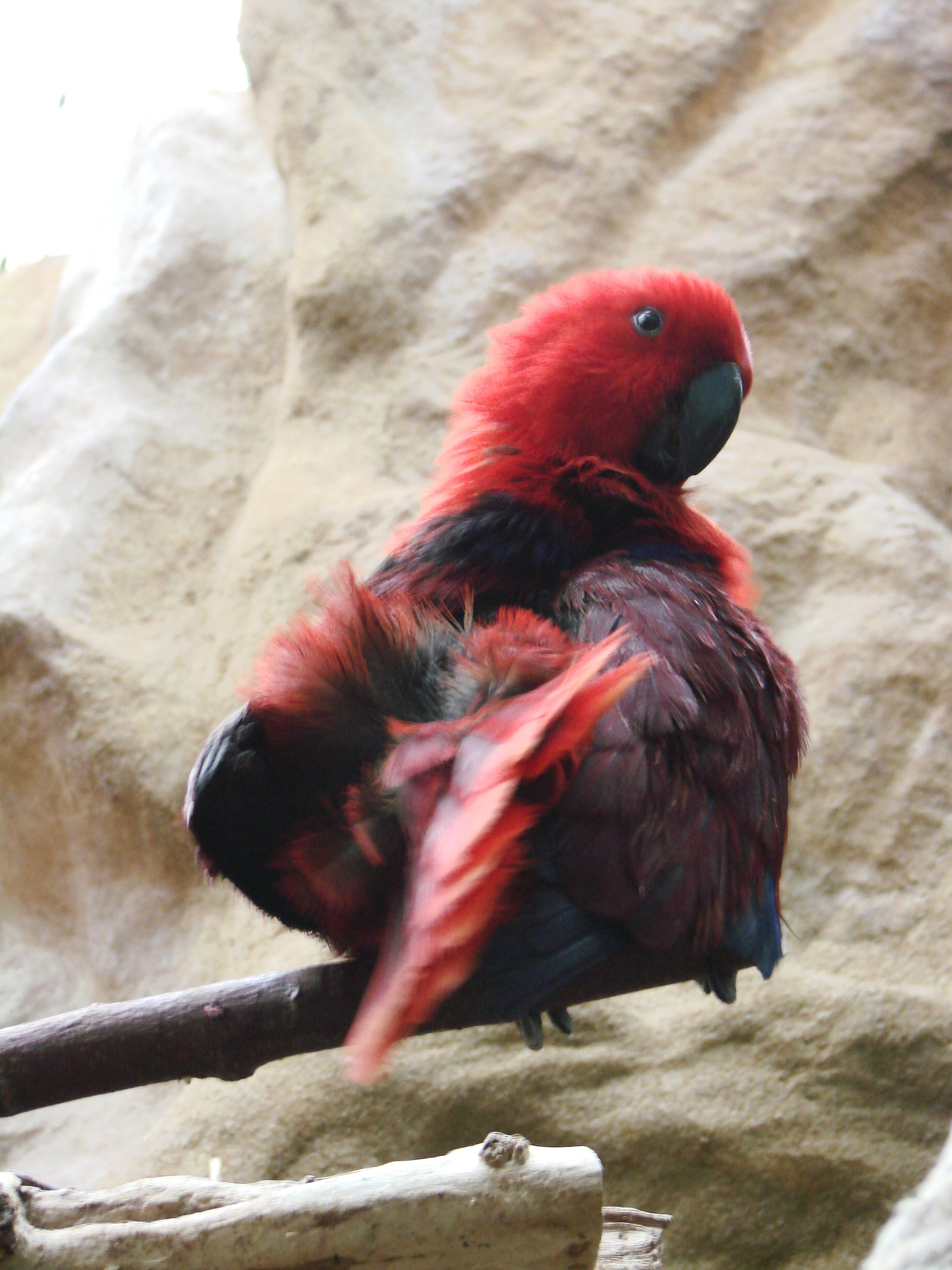
- Female

Conservation status
- Endangered (IUCN 3.1)

Scientific classification
- Kingdom: Animalia
- Phylum: Chordata
- Class: Aves
- Order: Psittaciformes
- Family: Psittaculidae
- Genus: Eclectus
- Species: E. cornelia

Binomial name
- Eclectus cornelia Bonaparte, 1850

= Sumba eclectus =

Species of parrot

The Sumba eclectus, or Cornelia's eclectus (Eclectus cornelia) is a parrot species which is native to Sumba. Also larger than the Moluccan eclectus, the male is a paler shade of green overall and has a bluer tail. The female has an all red plumage, except for the primaries which are a dark royal blue, and can be differentiated from the Tanimbar eclectus by the lack of yellow to her tail.

== Aviculture ==
The Sumba eclectus can be found in zoos and bird parks in Spain and Germany, although it is uncommon in wider aviculture.

Stuffed Sumba eclectus hen
