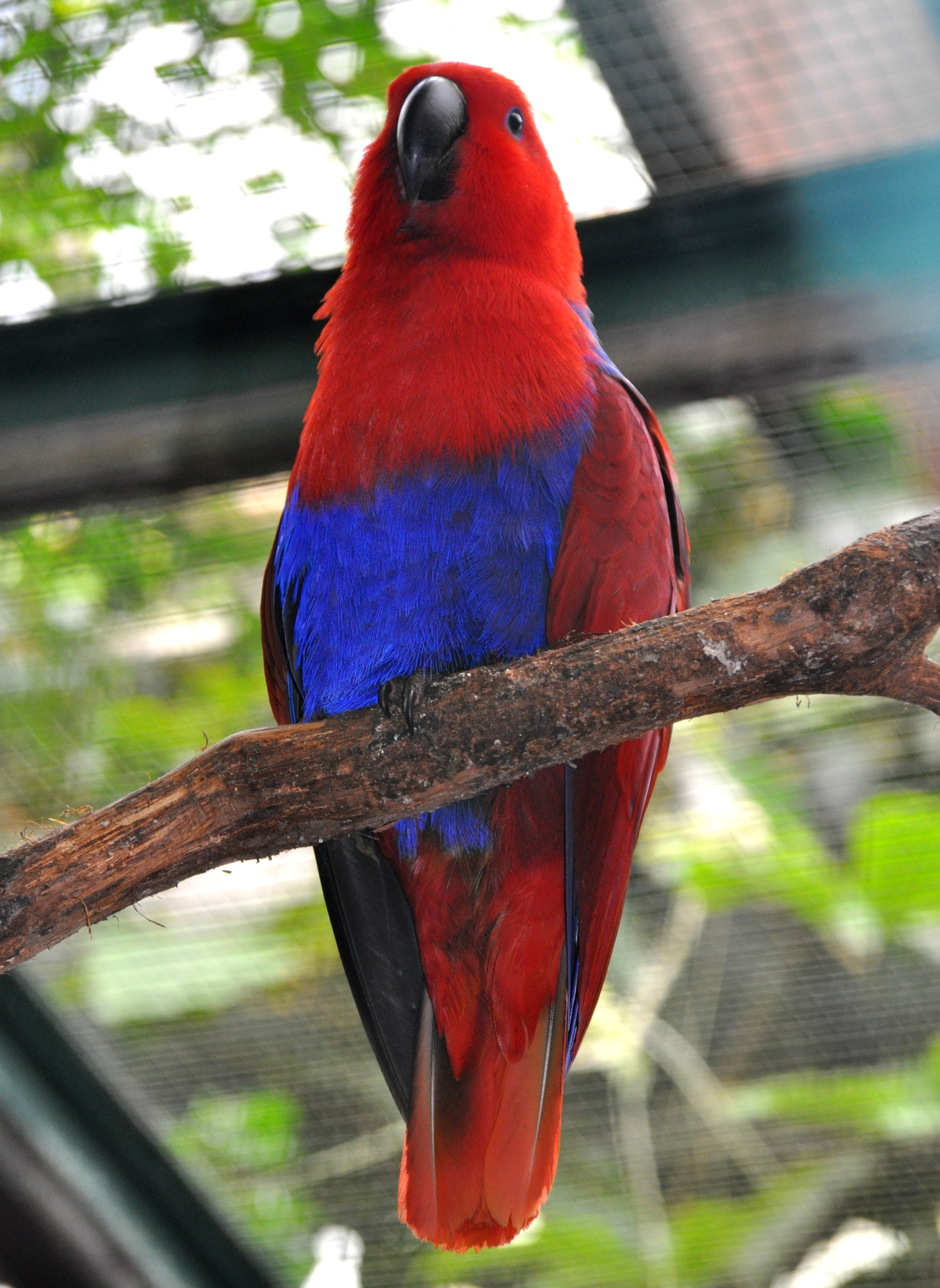
- Female
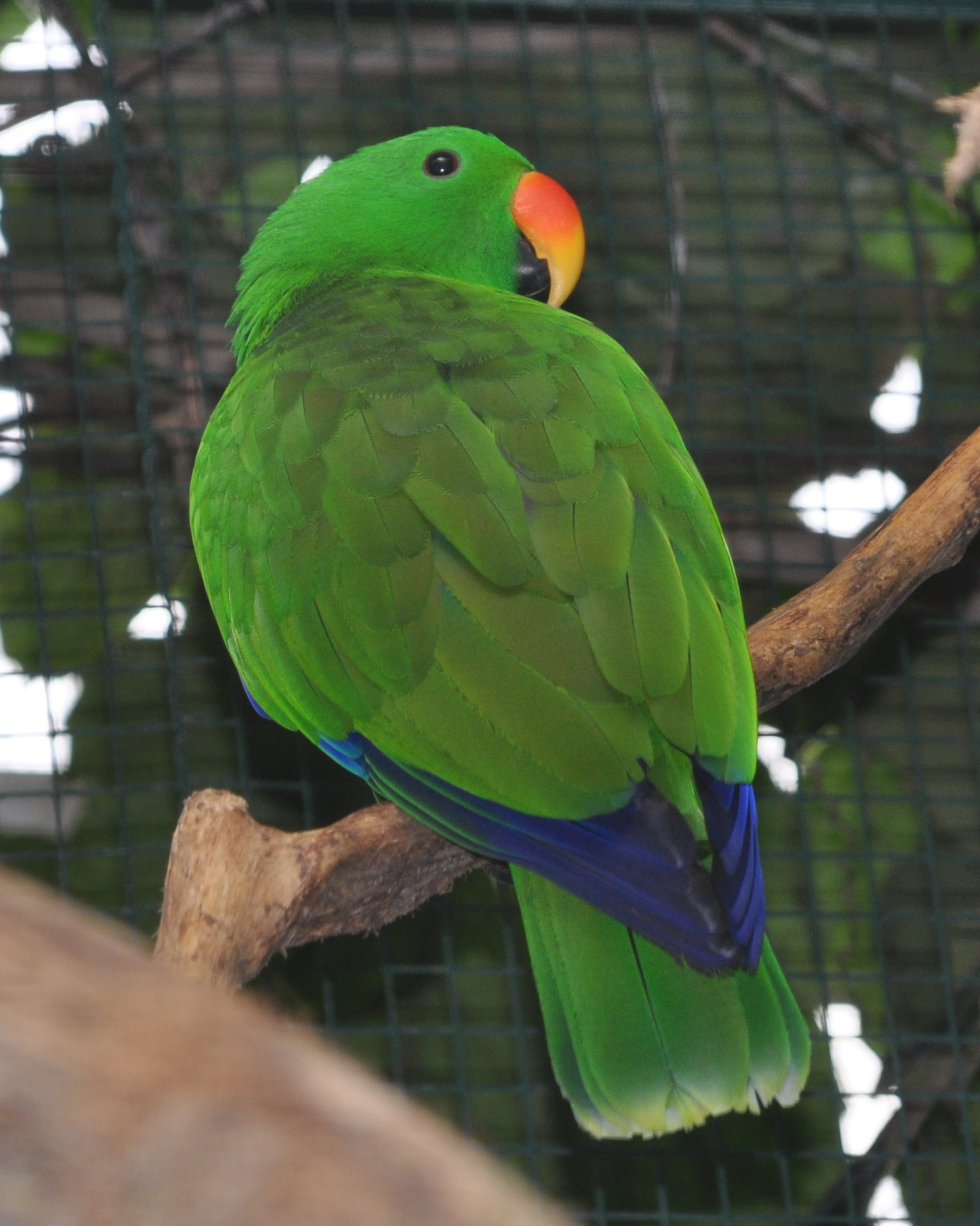
- Male

Conservation status
- Least Concern (IUCN 3.1)

Scientific classification
- Kingdom: Animalia
- Phylum: Chordata
- Class: Aves
- Order: Psittaciformes
- Family: Psittaculidae
- Genus: Eclectus
- Species: E. polychloros

Binomial name
- Eclectus polychloros (Scopoli, 1786)

= Papuan eclectus =

Species of parrot

The Papuan eclectus, red-sided eclectus, or New Guinea eclectus (Eclectus polychloros) is a parrot species which is native to New Guinea. Larger than the Moluccan eclectus, the green plumage of the male only has a slight yellow tinge and the tail is tipped with a half-inch yellow band. The central tail feathers are green and lateral ones blue and green. It is widely distributed from Kai Islands and western islands of the West Papua province in the west, across the island of New Guinea to the Trobriands, D'Entrecasteaux Islands, Louisiade Archipelago, Bismarck Archipelago, and Solomon Islands to the east, and south to the northern Cape York Peninsula of Australia. It has also been introduced to the Goram Islands, Indonesia.

== Subspecies ==
- E. p. polychloros, known as the Papuan eclectus, was named by Scopoli . Larger than the nominate race, the green plumage of the male only has a slight yellow tinge and the tail is tipped with a half-inch yellow band. The central tail feathers are green and lateral ones blue and green. It is widely distributed from Kai Islands and western islands of the West Papua province in the west, across the island of New Guinea to the Trobriands, D'Entrecasteaux Islands, and Louisiade Archipelago to the east. It has also been introduced to the Goram Islands, Indonesia.
- E. p. macgillivrayi, known as the Australian eclectus, was named by Gregory Mathews in 1912. It is found on the tip of Cape York Peninsula. It resembles E. p. polychloros, but is larger overall.
- E. p. solomonensis, known as the Solomon Island eclectus, resembles E. p. polychloros, but is smaller overall with smaller bills and paler orange in the upper mandible of the male. The green of the male has a more yellow tint, quite similar to the green of E. r. vosmaeri.

The following were previously considered to be valid subspecies, but are now included within the nominate ssp., E. p. polychloros by the IOC. They are still considered as separate subspecies under the taxonomy utilized by BirdLife International.

- Aru Island eclectus parrot (E. p. aruensis) – While some believe this bird is doubtfully valid from E. p. polychloros, others believe it is a distinct subspecies, as the rich yellow on the tail tip of the male often is infused with pink, orange, or bright red. At this point, no male eclectus in other subspecies has been described with this type of tail feather coloring. The Aru Island eclectus specimens are also larger than E. p. polychloros, often weighing 100 grams or more than E. p. polychloros.
- Biak Island eclectus parrot (E. p. biaki) – While some believe the Biak eclectus is doubtfully valid from E. p. polychloros, others believe it is a distinct subspecies due to the size difference, vocalization, and behavior differences.

== Breeding ==
The Papuan eclectus nests in tree cavities and breeds from April to September. Two eggs are typically laid.

== Aviculture ==
The Papuan eclectus is a popular pet parrot and there is a large avicultural population. Many Papuan eclectus in captivity in Australia are apparently hybrids between subspecies E. p. polychloros and E. p. solomonensis, as Taronga Zoo Sydney had a flock of these two subspecies in a large aviary many years ago. Specimens of the Australian subspecies E. p. macgillivrayi have only recently entered the aviculture market in Australia and are more expensive.

The World Parrot Trust recommends that the Papuan eclectus be kept in an enclosure with a minimum length of 3 metres (9.8 ft). It may live for up to 50 years in captivity.
