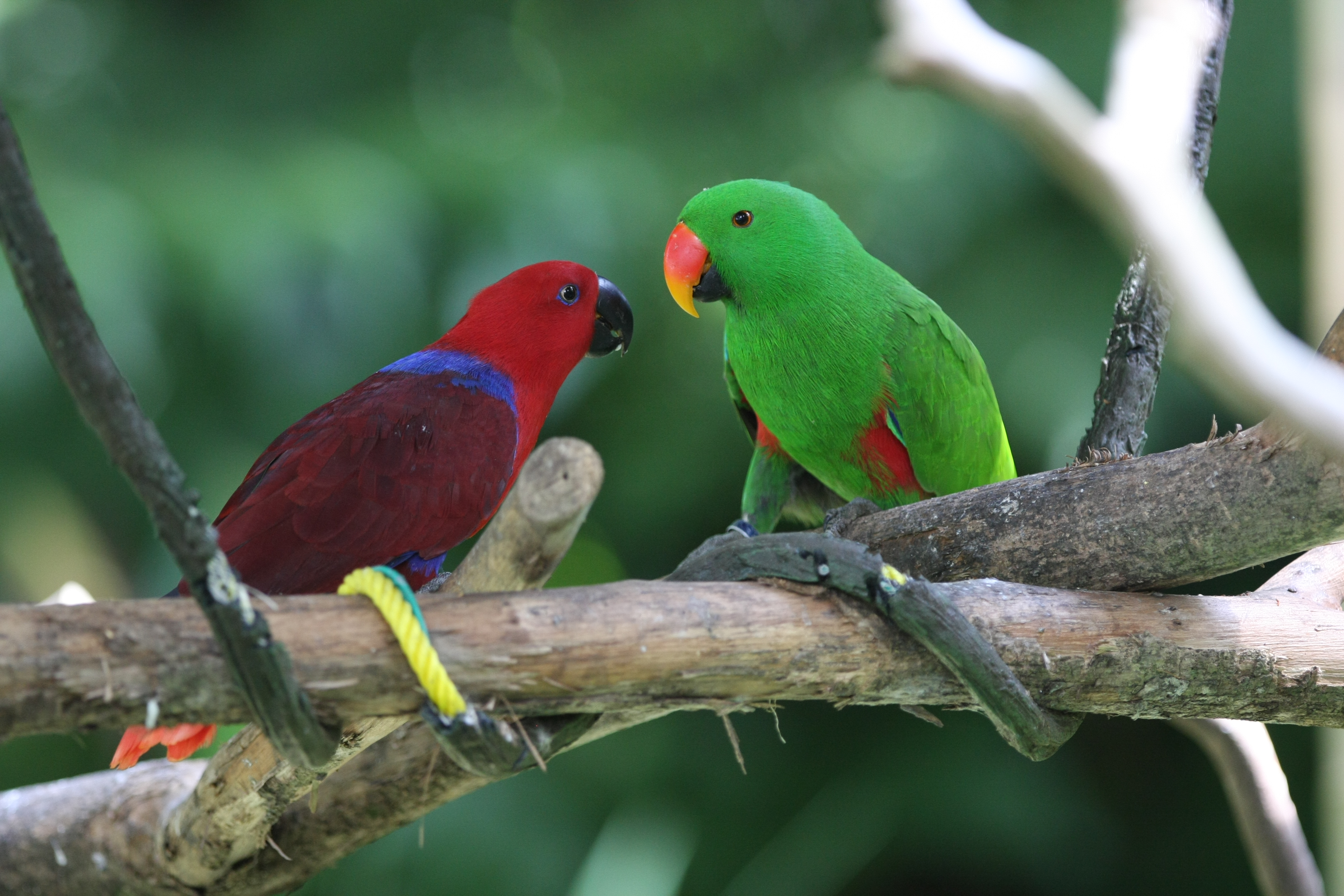
- A pair of Papuan eclectus parrots (Eclectus polychloros)

Scientific classification
- Kingdom: Animalia
- Phylum: Chordata
- Class: Aves
- Order: Psittaciformes
- Family: Psittaculidae
- Tribe: Psittaculini
- Genus: Eclectus; Wagler, 1832

Type species
- Psittacus grandis Gmelin, 1788

Species
- 4 extant, 1 extinct (see text)

= Eclectus =

Genus of birds

Eclectus is a genus of parrot, the Psittaciformes, which consists of four known extant species known as eclectus parrots and the extinct Eclectus infectus, the oceanic eclectus parrot. The extant eclectus parrots are medium-sized parrots native to regions of Oceania, particularly New Guinea and Australia. Males are mostly bright green, females are predominantly bright red. The male and female eclectus were once thought to be different species. The conservation status of the remaining species is least concern. Eclectus parrots do well in captivity, and are a very popular pet across the world.

== Description ==
The eclectus parrots are the most sexually dimorphic of all the parrot species. The contrast between the brilliant emerald green plumage of the male and the deep red/purple plumage of the female is so marked that the birds were, until the early 20th century, considered to be different species. Eclectus parrots generally have a big head and a short tail, and are striking in their coloration. They measure about 35–42 cm (14–17 in) in length. They unusually exhibit reverse sexual dichromatism, a form of sexual dimorphism where the two sexes have differential coloration with the females being more brightly colored. Males are mostly green, with bright red underwings, blue primaries, and a yellow beak, while females are a striking red with a royal blue underbelly and black beak.

Usually when birds exhibit reversed sexual dimorphism, it comes with a sex role reversal, in which the males who usually gather food are left to incubate eggs, while the female forages. In the eclectus, no such sex role reversal occurs. The male still forages, while the female incubates the eggs. Research has shown this dimorphism with no role reversal is a product of the rare nest hollows, and the selective pressures that accompany this.

It is thought that sexual selection has affected these birds in this way in order to provide camouflage for the male, while making the female a beacon, which is not what is usually seen in sexually dimorphic birds. Good nesting sites are rare to come by, so the female's bright coloration alerts other males to females with hollows in the area, with whom they can then mate. It also serves as a signal to other females that the nesting site is occupied. The male is primarily responsible for obtaining food for the female and chicks, so his green coloration provides adequate camouflage from predators, such as peregrine falcons, while he is in the rainforest canopy in search of food. The male also has UV coloration in his feathers, which allows him to appear extra radiant to females, who are able to visualize the UV spectrum, yet remain camouflaged to predators who cannot. This unique coloration is evidence of an evolutionary compromise between the need to attract and compete for mates, and the risk of predation.

The reported lifespan of Eclectus sp. varies widely, from ~20 years to more than 60 years. This range is largely due to their relatively recent popularity in aviculture, with many individuals in captivity having not yet reached their natural lifespan. Many owners of eclectus parrots have reported ages upwards of 45 years, noting their birds show no obvious signs of age-related health decline.

== Taxonomy ==
The genus was named by Johann Georg Wagler in 1832. The epithet derives from eklektos, the ancient Greek cum Latin term for 'chosen one'; Wagler acknowledges the Latin in a publication later the same year.

There are five species (four extant and one extinct) presently recognized in this genus:

Male	Female	Common name	Scientific name	Distribution
		Moluccan eclectus	Eclectus roratus with three subspecies.	Eclectus roratus roratus (grand eclectus) - central Moluccas including Buru, Seram, Ambon, Haruku and Saparua; Eclectus roratus vosmaeri - northern Moluccas including Morotai, Halmahera and Obi; †Eclectus roratus westermani
		Sumba eclectus	Eclectus cornelia	Sumba in the Lesser Sunda Archipelago
		Tanimbar eclectus	Eclectus riedeli	Tanimbar Islands in southern Moluccas
		Papuan eclectus	Eclectus polychloros with three subspecies. The former subspecies E. aruensis and E. biaki are now included within the nominate subspecies, E. polychloros.	Eclectus polychloros polychloros - southeastern Moluccas including Aru and Kai islands, and New Guinea (including Biak Islands); Eclectus polychloros solomonensis - Bismarck Archipelago (including Admiralty islands) and Solomon islands; Eclectus polychloros macgillivrayi (Australian eclectus) - Cape York Peninsula and northeast Queensland
		†Oceanic eclectus	Eclectus infectus	(Extinct)

Prior to 2023, all extant forms were classified as a single species, the eclectus parrot (E. roratus). The eclectus parrot was split into four species by the IOC in 2023; this had previously been done by the IUCN and BirdLife International. The oceanic eclectus is thought to be from the Late Pleistocene to the Holocene Epoch, and was found in Vanuatu, Fiji, and on the Tonga Archipelago. It became extinct around 3,000 years ago as a result of human settlement in these areas during that time.

Females of the Papuan (or red-sided), Solomon Island, Australian, Aru Island, and Biak eclectus all display a blue eye ring, blue breast, and do not have yellow in their plumage. The grand eclectus and Vosmaer's eclectus both lack the blue eye ring, and have a purple breast. Both the Tanimbar Island and Sumba Island eclectus are completely red, but the Sumba Island eclectus is larger than the Tanimbar, while the Tanimbar has yellow on its tail. The Australian eclectus is the largest of all the subspecies, at 37 cm (15 in).

== Habitat and distribution ==
The eclectus parrot is endemic to rainforests from New Guinea to the Solomon Islands, and the tip of the Cape York Peninsula of Australia. On the peninsula, they are restricted to rainforest patches in the Iron and McIllwraith ranges. Though geographically, the areas of Papua New Guinea and Australia where these parrots live seem relatively close together, these parrots do not fly enough to be able to cross the 70 miles between the peninsula and mainland Papua New Guinea. As such, it is thought that they expanded from Papua New Guinea into Australia around 10,000 years ago, when the two were connected by a land bridge. They prefer to stay in the canopy level of the rainforests, and can nest anywhere from 20 to 30 meters (66 to 98 ft) above the ground. Breeding hollows lower than this height tend to flood easily in the rainforest climate, and are generally avoided if possible.

== Behavior ==
=== Vocalizations ===
Eclectus parrots have a varied range of calls, from a loud, high-pitched squawk to whistles and screeches. They have also been observed to make a chime-like call when a male returns to the nest with food, in what seems to be a show of gratitude or an acknowledgement of return.

=== Diet ===
In the wild, eclectus parrots primarily feed on various fruits and their pulp. However, they will also feed on seeds, leaf buds, blossoms, nectar, figs, and nuts. They are frequently found to be eating the pulp of the fruit of Salacia chinensis (lolly berry) and Leea indica (bandicoot berry), and the seeds of Dodonaea lanceolata. These items are of high nutritional value to the birds.

These parrots eat intermittently, in order to increase food storage capacity and process meals as quickly and efficiently as possible. They have special adaptations in their digestive system to help them with this. Their esophagus is wide and flexible, to allow the fast passage of food and rapid digestion, and their proventriculus (glandular region between the crop and gizzard) is elongated and highly distensible, allowing it to hold comparable amounts of food as the crop. Eclectus parrots can produce the fat they do not get from their diet endogenously in their liver, from hexose sugars found in the fruit pulp they eat.

After securing a good nesting hollow, females generally never leave the nest unless threatened, so the males are primarily responsible for feeding the female and her chicks. They have been observed to travel long distances in search of food, some over a 30 km^{2} (12 sq mi) range. The males usually feed the female in the mornings and the afternoons, and generally stick to a strict and regulated feeding schedule.

=== Reproduction ===
As stated previously, eclectus parrots nest in hollow cavities 20 to 30 meters above the ground. Optimal nesting hollows are relatively rare within the eclectus' habitat, and can be very difficult to find. As such, females tend to monopolize good nesting hollows once found, staying there up to 11 months a year, and returning to the same nest at times for multiple years. Females have been known to fight off other females, sometimes to the death, to defend their nesting hollows. Males have been known to travel unusually large distances to mate with females, the longest found being 7.2 kilometers (4.5 miles).

Eclectus parrots are unusual among parrots because they exhibit both polyandrous mating (females mate with multiple males) and polygynandrous mating (males mate with multiple females and females mate with multiple males). Even more unusual, these birds exhibit a form of polyandry known as cooperative polyandry, in which multiple males breed with a single female, and all the males work together to help the female raise the chicks, rather than compete with each other. They are the only parrot known to do this. Females will lay two eggs per clutch, but often only fledge one young.

Eclectus are also unusual in that they can bias the sex of their offspring, such that they can manipulate whether their offspring are male or female. It is thought that this behavior occurs as a result of the scarcity of their nesting hollows. As such, females will only have male offspring when resources are plentiful, a good nesting hollow is secured, and many males are around to feed her and her offspring.
