= Salacia oblonga =

Conservation status
- Vulnerable (IUCN 3.1)

Scientific classification
- Kingdom: Plantae
- Clade: Tracheophytes
- Clade: Angiosperms
- Clade: Eudicots
- Clade: Rosids
- Order: Celastrales
- Family: Celastraceae
- Genus: Salacia
- Species: S. oblonga

Binomial name
- Salacia oblonga Wall.

Synonyms
- Comocladia serrata Blanco

Species of plant

Salacia oblonga, known as oblong leaf salacia in English, ekanayaka in Kannada, ponkorandi in Malayalam, ponkoranti in Tamil, and ekanayake in Tulu, is a climbing shrub that tends to strangle other plants. It is native to India and Sri Lanka.

== Description ==
Oblong leaf salacia is a climbing shrub with densely warty branchlets. Leaves are oblong, green, veined, and borne on stalks up to 1 cm long. The flowers are green-yellow, appearing in March through May, that yield orange-red berries. It grows primarily in evergreen and semi-evergreen forests.

== Traditional medicine ==
Oblong leaf salacia is described as a treatment for diabetes in the traditional medical systems of India and Sri Lanka.

The closely related species Salacia reticulata and Salacia chinesis are also used for people with diabetes.
