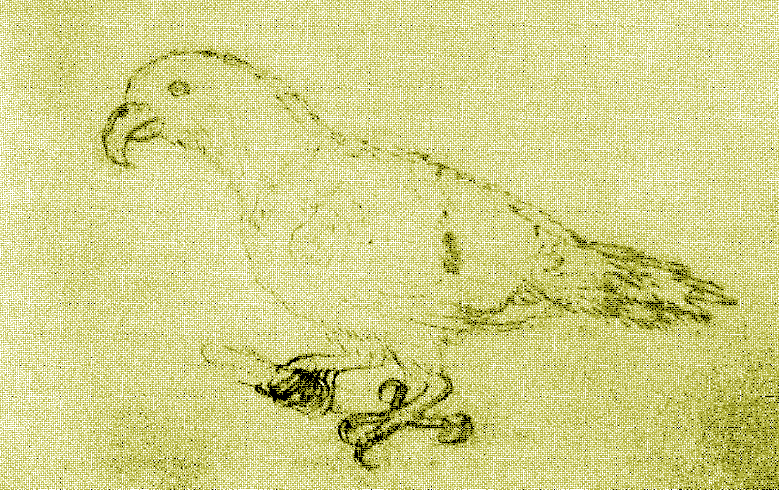
- A 1793 drawing of a parrot believed to be the extinct oceanic eclectus

Conservation status
- Extinct (IUCN 3.1)

Scientific classification
- Kingdom: Animalia
- Phylum: Chordata
- Class: Aves
- Order: Psittaciformes
- Family: Psittaculidae
- Genus: Eclectus
- Species: †E. infectus

Binomial name
- †Eclectus infectus Steadman, 2006

= Oceanic eclectus =

Oceanic eclectus Temporal range: Late Pleistocene to Holocene

Extinct species of bird

The oceanic eclectus (Eclectus infectus) is an extinct parrot species which occurred on Tonga, Vanuatu and possibly on Fiji. Its closest living relative is the Moluccan eclectus (E. roratus sensu lato), which has proportionally larger wings than the oceanic eclectus parrot. The fossil material unearthed in November 1989 in Late Pleistocene and Holocene deposits on 'Eua, Lifuka, 'Uiha and Vanuatu and described in 2006 by David William Steadman include a complete femur, five radii, a quadrate bone, a mandible, a coracoid, two sterna, two humeri, two ulnae, two tibiotarsi, a carpometacarpus, a tarsometatarsus, and three pedal phalanges.

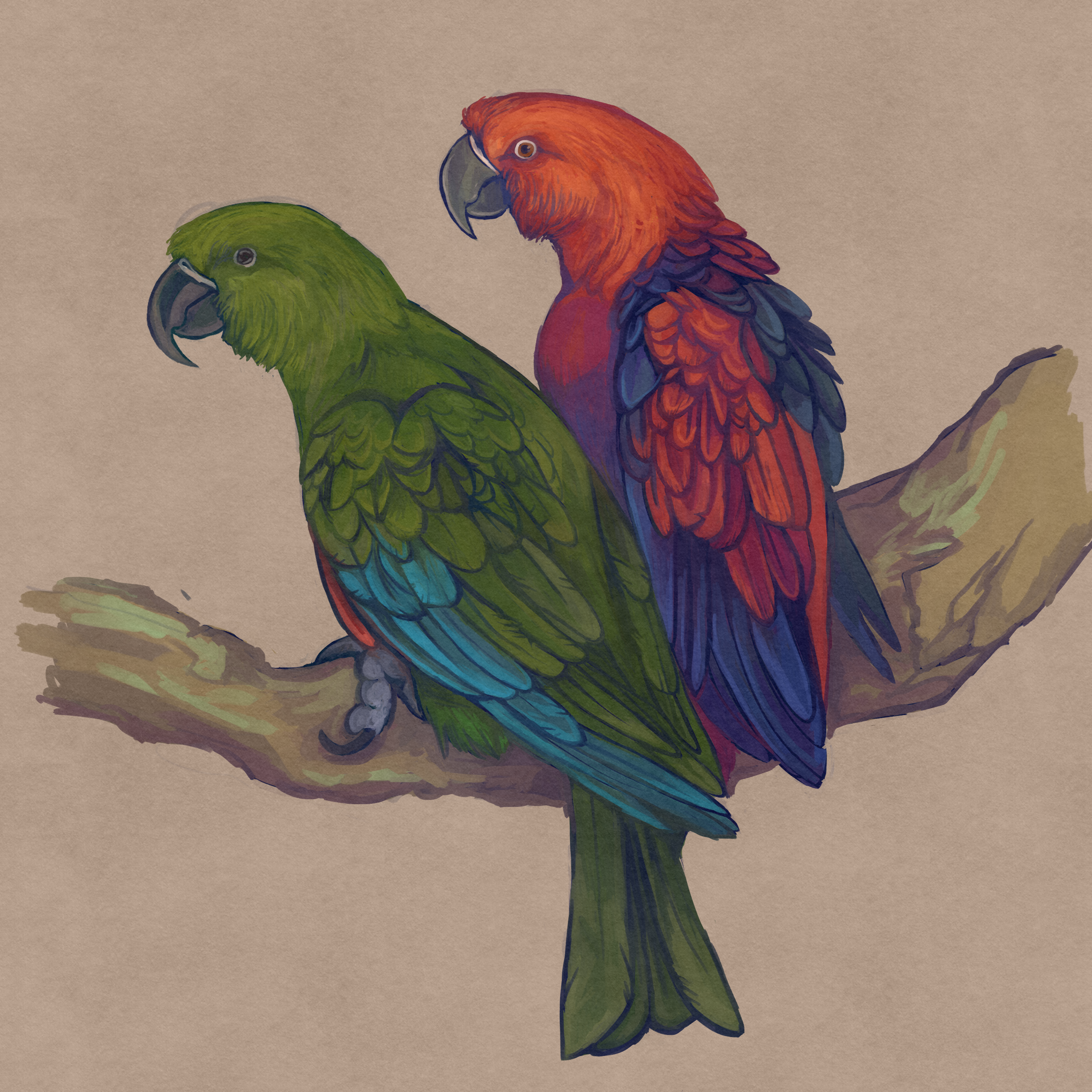
Life restoration of a male and female

The oceanic eclectus parrot became extinct on Tonga during the early settlement 3,000 years ago, presumably due to human-caused factors. On Vava'u, it may have survived into historic times because among the drawings which were created in 1793 during Alessandro Malaspina's Pacific expedition, there is one sketch which appears to portray an Oceanic eclectus.

Fossil remains of the oceanic eclectus have been found in archaeological sites in the islands of Tonga and Vanuatu. The species presumably existed in Fiji, as well. E. infectus had proportionally smaller wings than the Moluccan eclectus. The species became extinct after the arrival of humans 3000 years ago, presumably due to human-caused factors (habitat loss, introduced species).
