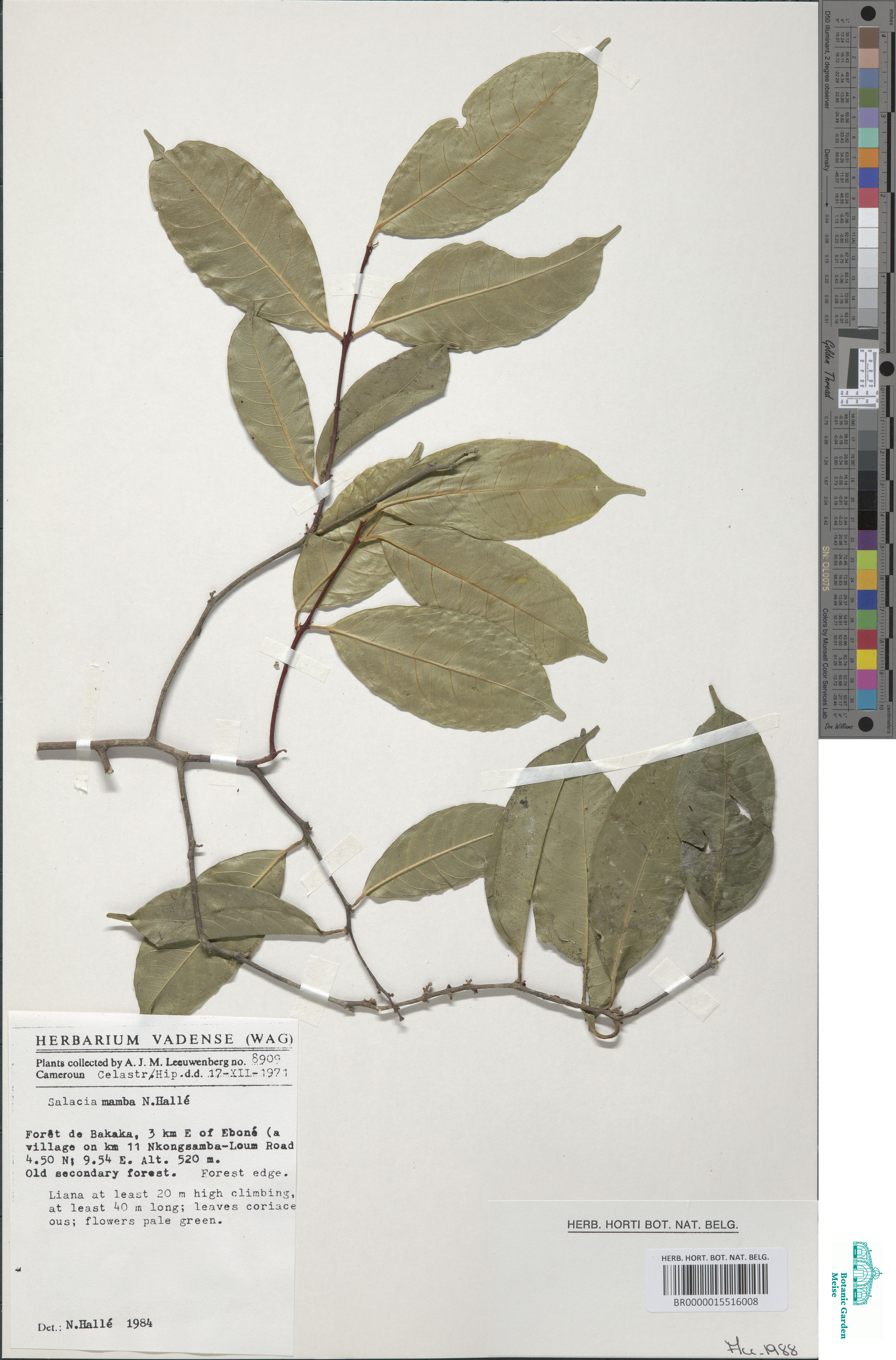

Conservation status
- Near Threatened (IUCN 3.1)

Scientific classification
- Kingdom: Plantae
- Clade: Tracheophytes
- Clade: Angiosperms
- Clade: Eudicots
- Clade: Rosids
- Order: Celastrales
- Family: Celastraceae
- Genus: Salacia
- Species: S. mamba

Binomial name
- Salacia mamba N.Hallé

= Salacia mamba =

Species of flowering plant

Salacia mamba is a species of plant in the family Celastraceae. It is found in Cameroon, the Republic of the Congo, and Gabon. Its natural habitat is subtropical or tropical moist lowland forests. It is threatened by habitat loss.
