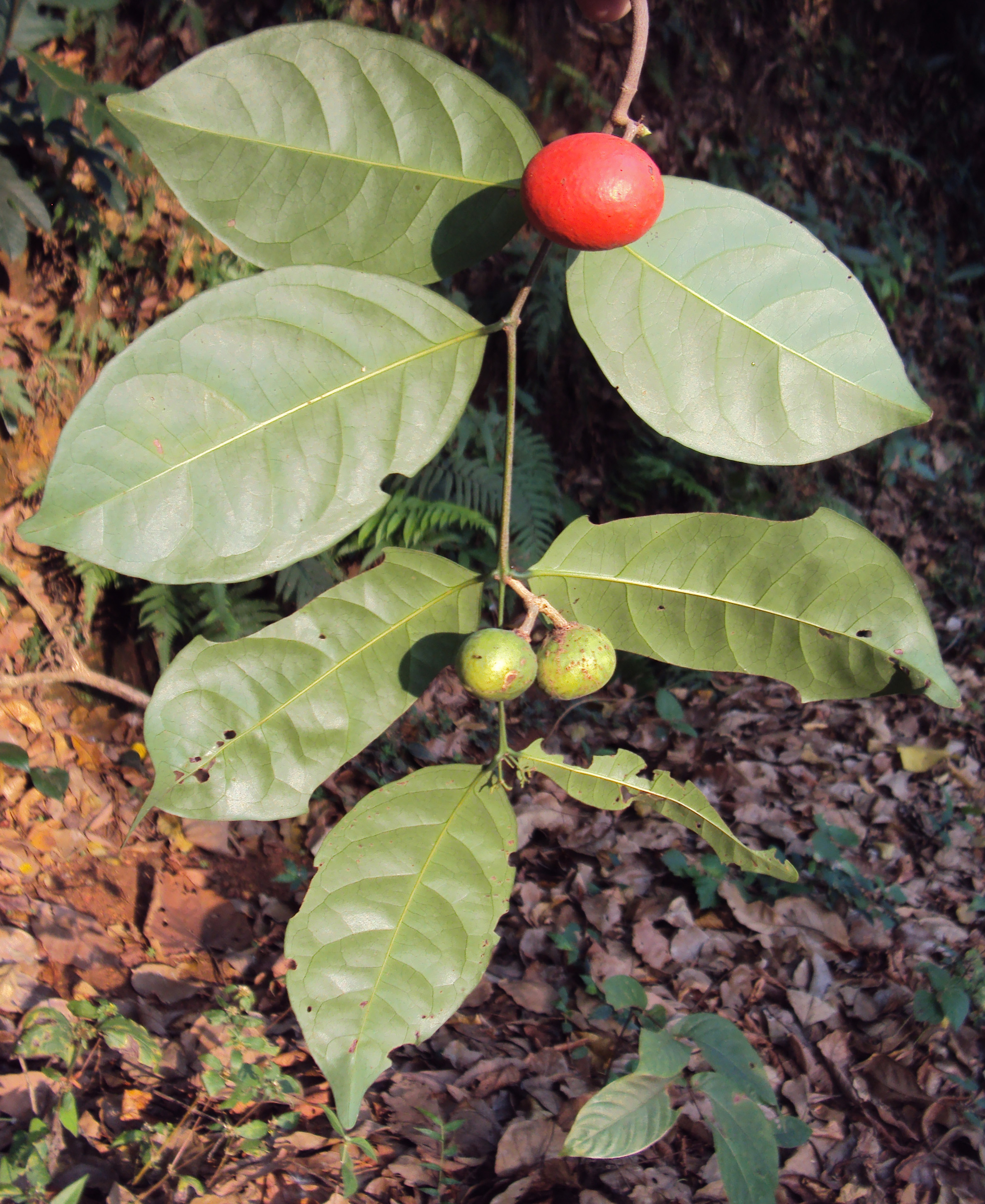
- Salacia fruticosa leaves and fruit

Conservation status
- Least Concern (IUCN 3.1)

Scientific classification
- Kingdom: Plantae
- Clade: Tracheophytes
- Clade: Angiosperms
- Clade: Eudicots
- Clade: Rosids
- Order: Celastrales
- Family: Celastraceae
- Genus: Salacia
- Species: S. fruticosa

Binomial name
- Salacia fruticosa Wall.

= Salacia fruticosa =

Species of plant

Salacia fruticosa is a species of flowering plant belonging to the family Celastraceae. It is native to India.

== Description ==
Salacia fruticosa is a woody climbing shrub. Young shoots have fine hairs. Leaves are elliptic-ovate or elliptic-oblong with rounded or cuneate base. Brownish yellow flowers are seen in axillary cymes. There are five petals, fleshy disc and three stamens. Mature fruit is a red berry with 1-3 seeds.

== Range ==
Western Ghats, India.

== Habitat ==
Semi-evergreen and evergreen forests and sacred groves.
