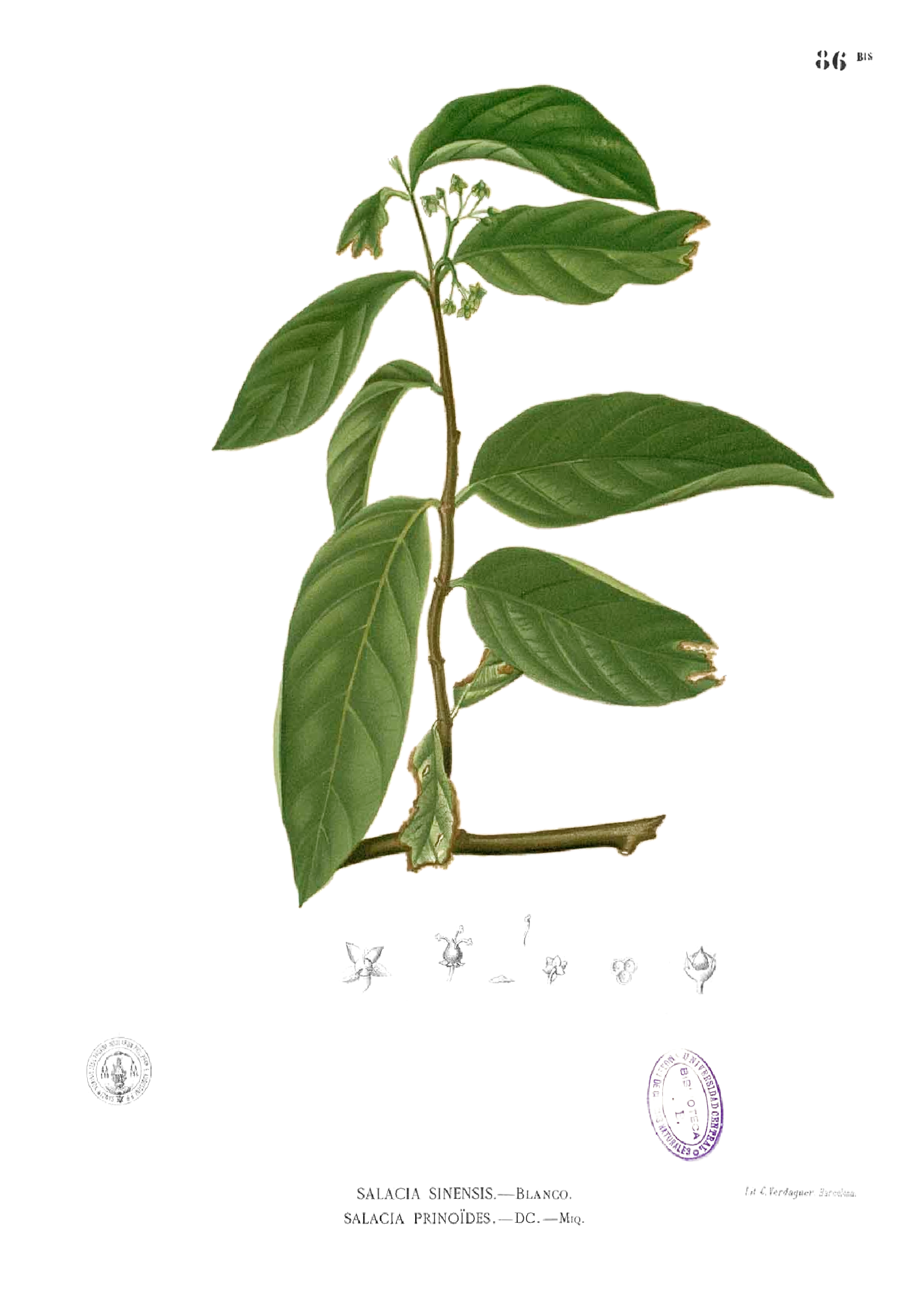
- Salacia prinoides

Scientific classification
- Kingdom: Plantae
- Clade: Tracheophytes
- Clade: Angiosperms
- Clade: Eudicots
- Clade: Rosids
- Order: Celastrales
- Family: Celastraceae
- Genus: Salacia; L.

Synonyms
- Amphizoma Miers; Annulodiscus Tardieu; Calypso Thouars; Christmannia Dennst. ex Kostel.; Clercia Vell.; Courondi Adans.; Curondia Raf.; Custinia Neck.; Diplesthes Harv.; Johnia Roxb.; Raddia DC. ex Miers; Raddisia Leandro; Salacicratea Loes.; Thermophila Miers; Tonsella Schreb.; Tontelea Aubl.

= Salacia (plant) =

Genus of flowering plants

Salacia is a genus of plants in the family Celastraceae. They are woody climbers naturally found in tropical regions.

Several species in this genus have been used in traditional medicine, such as the Ayurvedic system from India.

The chemical constituents of root bark include polyphenols such as salacinol, kotalanol, and mangiferin.

== Species ==
As of March 2026, Plants of the World Online accepts 214 species:

- Salacia acevedoi Lombardi
- Salacia adolphi-friderici Loes. ex Harms
- Salacia agasthiamalana Udayan, Yohannan & Pradeep
- Salacia alata De Wild.
- Salacia alveolata Louis ex R.Wilczek
- Salacia alwynii Mennega
- Salacia amplectens A.C.Sm.
- Salacia amplifolia Merr. ex Chun & F.C.How
- Salacia aneityensis Guillaumin
- Salacia annettae N.Hallé
- Salacia arborea Peyr.
- Salacia arenicola Gosline
- Salacia aurantiaca C.Y.Wu
- Salacia bangalensis Vermoesen ex R.Wilczek
- Salacia beddomei Gamble
- Salacia belingana N.Hallé
- Salacia blepharophora Ding Hou
- Salacia brunoniana Wight & Arn.
- Salacia bussei Loes.
- Salacia caillei A.Chev. ex Hutch. & M.B.Moss
- Salacia callensii R.Wilczek
- Salacia caloneura A.C.Sm.
- Salacia capitulata N.Hallé
- Salacia castaneifolia Ridl.
- Salacia cauliflora A.C.Sm.
- Salacia cerasifera Welw. ex Oliv.
- Salacia cerasiformis Teijsm. & Binn.
- Salacia chinensis L.
- Salacia chlorantha Oliv.
- Salacia cochinchinensis Lour.
- Salacia columna N.Hallé
- Salacia confertiflora Merr.
- Salacia congolensis De Wild. & T.Durand
- Salacia conraui Loes.
- Salacia cordata (Miers) Mennega
- Salacia cornifolia Hook.f.
- Salacia coronata N.Hallé
- Salacia crassifolia (Mart.) G.Don
- Salacia cymosa Elmer
- Salacia debilis (G.Don) Walp.
- Salacia devredii R.Wilczek
- Salacia dewevrei De Wild. & T.Durand
- Salacia diandra Thwaites
- Salacia dicarpellata Loes.
- Salacia dimidia N.Hallé
- Salacia diplasia N.Hallé
- Salacia disepala (C.T.White) Ding Hou
- Salacia dongnaiensis Pierre
- Salacia ducis-wuertembergiae Hochst.
- Salacia dusenii Loes.
- Salacia ekoka Louis ex R.Wilczek
- Salacia elegans Welw. ex Oliv.
- Salacia elliptica (Mart.) G.Don
- Salacia erecta (G.Don) Walp.
- Salacia erythrocarpa K.Schum.
- Salacia euphlebia Merr.
- Salacia eurypetala Loes.
- Salacia exsculpta Korth.
- Salacia ferrifodina N.Hallé
- Salacia fimbrisepala Loes.
- Salacia floribunda Wight
- Salacia forsteniana Miq.
- Salacia fruticosa Wall. ex M.A.Lawson
- Salacia frutiplatensis Cast.-Campos
- Salacia fugax Lombardi & M.Serna
- Salacia gabunensis Loes.
- Salacia gagnepainiana Tardieu
- Salacia gambleana Whiting & Kaul
- Salacia germainii R.Wilczek
- Salacia gerrardii Harv. & Sprague
- Salacia gigantea Loes.
- Salacia glaucifolia C.Y.Wu
- Salacia godefroyana Pierre
- Salacia grandiflora Kurz
- Salacia grandifolia (Mart.) G.Don
- Salacia hainanensis Chun & F.C.How
- Salacia hallei Jongkind
- Salacia hispida Blakelock
- Salacia howesii Hutch. & M.B.Moss
- Salacia impressifolia (Miers) A.C.Sm.
- Salacia insignis A.C.Sm.
- Salacia intermedia Ding Hou
- Salacia ituriensis Loes.
- Salacia jenkinsii Kurz
- Salacia juruana Loes.
- Salacia kalahiensis Korth.
- Salacia kanukuensis A.C.Sm.
- Salacia khasiana Purkay.
- Salacia kivuensis R.Wilczek
- Salacia klainei Pierre ex R.Wilczek
- Salacia korthalsiana Miq.
- Salacia kraussii Harv.
- Salacia krigsneri Lombardi
- Salacia laotica Pit.
- Salacia lateritia N.Hallé
- Salacia laurentii De Wild.
- Salacia laurifolia Stapf
- Salacia lebrunii R.Wilczek
- Salacia ledermannii (Loes. ex Harms) Ding Hou
- Salacia lehmbachii Loes.
- Salacia lenticellosa Loes. ex Harms
- Salacia leptoclada Tul.
- Salacia letestui Pellegr.
- Salacia letouzeyana N.Hallé
- Salacia leucoclada Ridl.
- Salacia loloensis Loes.
- Salacia lomensis Loes.
- Salacia longipedicellata Ding Hou
- Salacia longipes (Oliv.) N.Hallé
- Salacia lovettii N.Hallé & B.Mathew
- Salacia lucida Oliv.
- Salacia luebbertii Loes.
- Salacia maburensis Mennega
- Salacia macrantha A.C.Sm.
- Salacia macrocremastra Lombardi
- Salacia macrophylla Blume
- Salacia macrosperma Wight
- Salacia madagascariensis (Lam.) DC.
- Salacia maingayi M.A.Lawson
- Salacia majumdarii (Chakrab. & M.Gangop.) B.D.Naithani
- Salacia malabarica Gamble
- Salacia malipoensis X.D.Ma & J.Y.Shen
- Salacia mamba N.Hallé
- Salacia mannii Oliv.
- Salacia marginata Ding Hou
- Salacia maudouxii R.Wilczek
- Salacia mayumbensis Exell & Mendonça
- Salacia megacarpa N.V.Page & Nandikar
- Salacia megistophylla Standl.
- Salacia membranacea M.A.Lawson
- Salacia menglaensis J.Y.Shen, L.C.Yan & Landrein
- Salacia mennegana Lombardi
- Salacia miegei N.Hallé
- Salacia minutiflora Ridl.
- Salacia miqueliana Loes.
- Salacia mosenii A.C.Sm.
- Salacia multiflora (Lam.) DC.
- Salacia myrtifolia Griff.
- Salacia ndakala R.Wilczek
- Salacia negrensis Lombardi
- Salacia nemorosa Lombardi
- Salacia nigra Cheek
- Salacia nitida (Benth.) N.E.Br.
- Salacia nitidissima Merr.
- Salacia noronhioides Pierre
- Salacia oblonga Wall. ex Wight & Arn.
- Salacia oblongifolia Blume
- Salacia obovatilimba S.Y.Pao
- Salacia odorata Lombardi
- Salacia oleoides Baker
- Salacia oliveriana Loes.
- Salacia opacifolia (J.F.Macbr.) A.C.Sm.
- Salacia orientalis N.Robson
- Salacia ovalis Korth.
- Salacia owabiensis Hoyle
- Salacia pachycarpa A.C.Sm.
- Salacia pachyphylla (Miers) Peyr.
- Salacia pallens Pierre
- Salacia pallescens Oliv.
- Salacia panamensis Lombardi
- Salacia papuana (Loes.) Ding Hou
- Salacia parkinsonii K.Schum.
- Salacia petenensis Lundell
- Salacia phuquocensis Tardieu
- Salacia pierrei N.Hallé
- Salacia platyphylla Kurz
- Salacia polyantha Steud.
- Salacia polysperma Hu
- Salacia preussii Loes.
- Salacia pueblana Lombardi
- Salacia pynaertii De Wild.
- Salacia pyriformioides Loes.
- Salacia pyriformis (Sabine) Paxton
- Salacia quadrangulata R.Wilczek
- Salacia regeliana J.Braun & K.Schum.
- Salacia rehmannii Schinz
- Salacia reticulata Wight
- Salacia rhodesiaca Blakelock
- Salacia rivularis Louis ex R.Wilczek
- Salacia rostrata Pierre
- Salacia × rufescens Hook.f.
- Salacia saigonensis Baill.
- Salacia salacioides (Roxb.) R.S.Rao & Hemadri
- Salacia senegalensis (Lam.) DC.
- Salacia sessiliflora Hand.-Mazz.
- Salacia smaliana Brandis
- Salacia solimoesensis A.C.Sm.
- Salacia sororia Miq.
- Salacia spectabilis A.C.Sm.
- Salacia staudtiana Loes.
- Salacia stuhlmanniana Loes.
- Salacia subalternifolia Merr. & L.M.Perry
- Salacia subicterica N.Hallé
- Salacia sulfur Loes. & H.J.P.Winkl.
- Salacia talbotii Baker f.
- Salacia tessmannii Loes.
- Salacia togoica Loes.
- Salacia tortuosa Griff.
- Salacia tuberculata Blakelock
- Salacia typhina Pierre
- Salacia ulei Loes.
- Salacia vellaniana Udayan, Yohannan & Pradeep
- Salacia venosa Ding Hou
- Salacia vernicosa Lombardi
- Salacia verrucosa Wight
- Salacia villiersii N.Hallé
- Salacia viminea Wall. ex M.A.Lawson
- Salacia viridiramis Lombardi
- Salacia vitiensis A.C.Sm.
- Salacia volubilis Loes. & H.J.P.Winkl.
- Salacia wayanadica Sujana, Nagaraju, M.K.R.Narayanan & Anil Kumar
- Salacia wenzelii Merr.
- Salacia whytei Loes.
- Salacia wrightii Urb.
- Salacia zenkeri Loes.
