= Salacia fimbrisepala =

Conservation status
- Data Deficient (IUCN 3.1)

Scientific classification
- Kingdom: Plantae
- Clade: Tracheophytes
- Clade: Angiosperms
- Clade: Eudicots
- Clade: Rosids
- Order: Celastrales
- Family: Celastraceae
- Genus: Salacia
- Species: S. fimbrisepala

Binomial name
- Salacia fimbrisepala Loes.

Species of flowering plant

Salacia fimbrisepala is a species of flowering plant in the family Celastraceae. It is found in Cameroon and Ghana. Its natural habitat is subtropical or tropical dry forests. It is threatened by habitat loss.
