= Arnout Vosmaer =

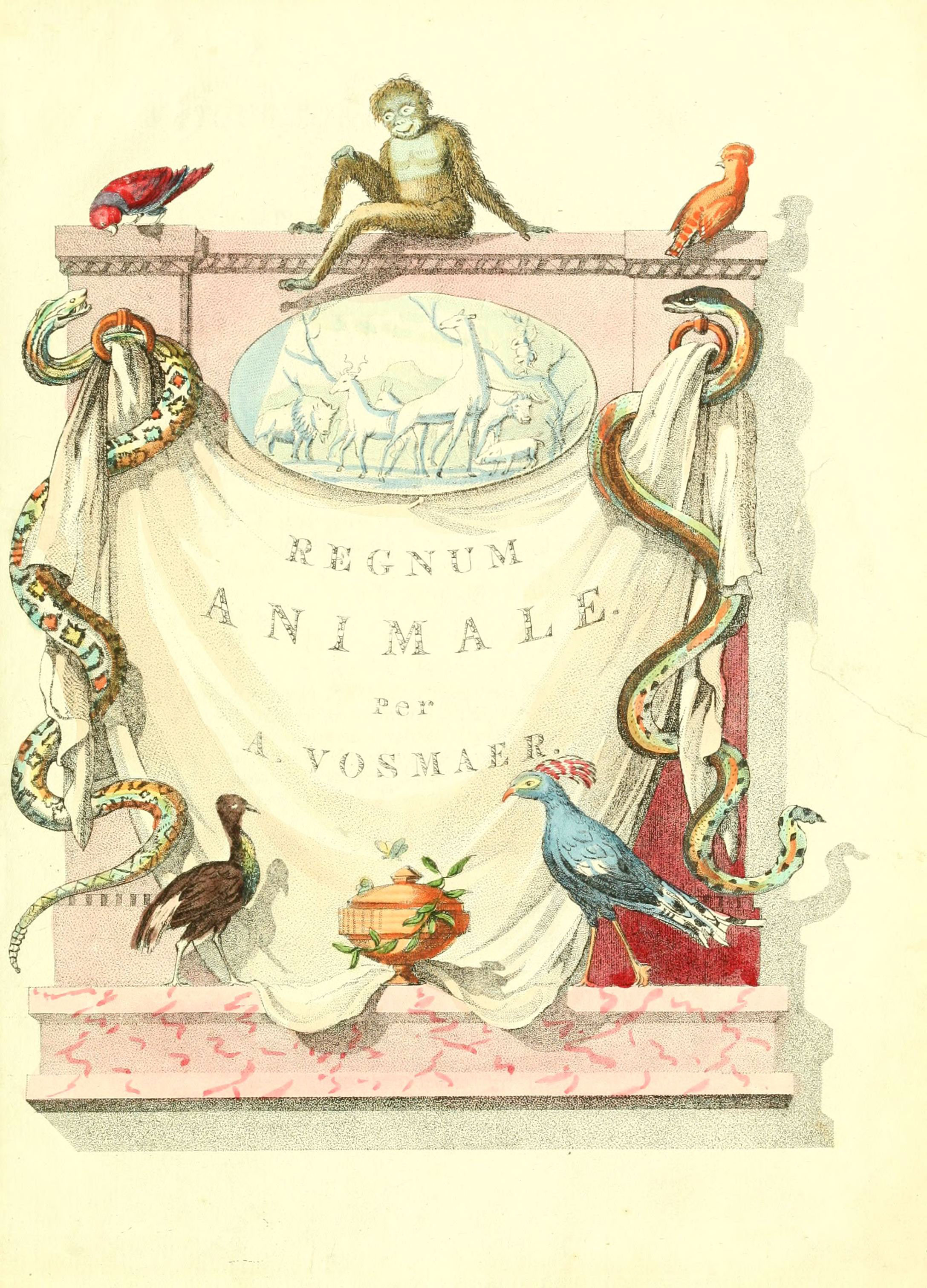
Cover page of Regnum animale

Arnout Vosmaer (23 September 1720 – 15 January 1799) was a Dutch naturalist and collection curator.

== Life ==
Arnout Vosmaer was born in Rotterdam on 23 September 1720 and died in The Hague on 15 January 1799. Very little is known about his personal life.

In 1756 Vosmaer became the director of a natural history collection started by Princess Anna, the wife of William IV, Prince of Orange and continued by their son William V. Vosmaer held the post until the Batavian Revolution in 1795.

== Works ==
Vosmaer produced a series of 34 booklets describing animals that were published between 1766 and 1805 in both Dutch and French. Most were on species kept in Prince William V's menagerie. Each booklet included at least one and sometimes two plates engraved by Simon Fokke, many of which were based on watercolours by Aert Schouman.

Thirty three of the booklets were gathered together after Vosmaer's death and published with the unwieldy title: Natuurkundige beschryving eener uitmuntende verzameling van zeldsaame gedierten, bestaande in Oost- en Westindische viervoetige dieren, vogelen en slangen, weleer leevend voorhanden geweest zynde, buiten den Haag, op het Kleine Loo van Z.D.H. den prins van Oranje-Nassau, usually referred to simply as Regnum animale.

Vosmaer's eclectus (Eclectus roratus vosmaeri), a subspecies of the Moluccan eclectus parrot native to North Maluku is named after him.
