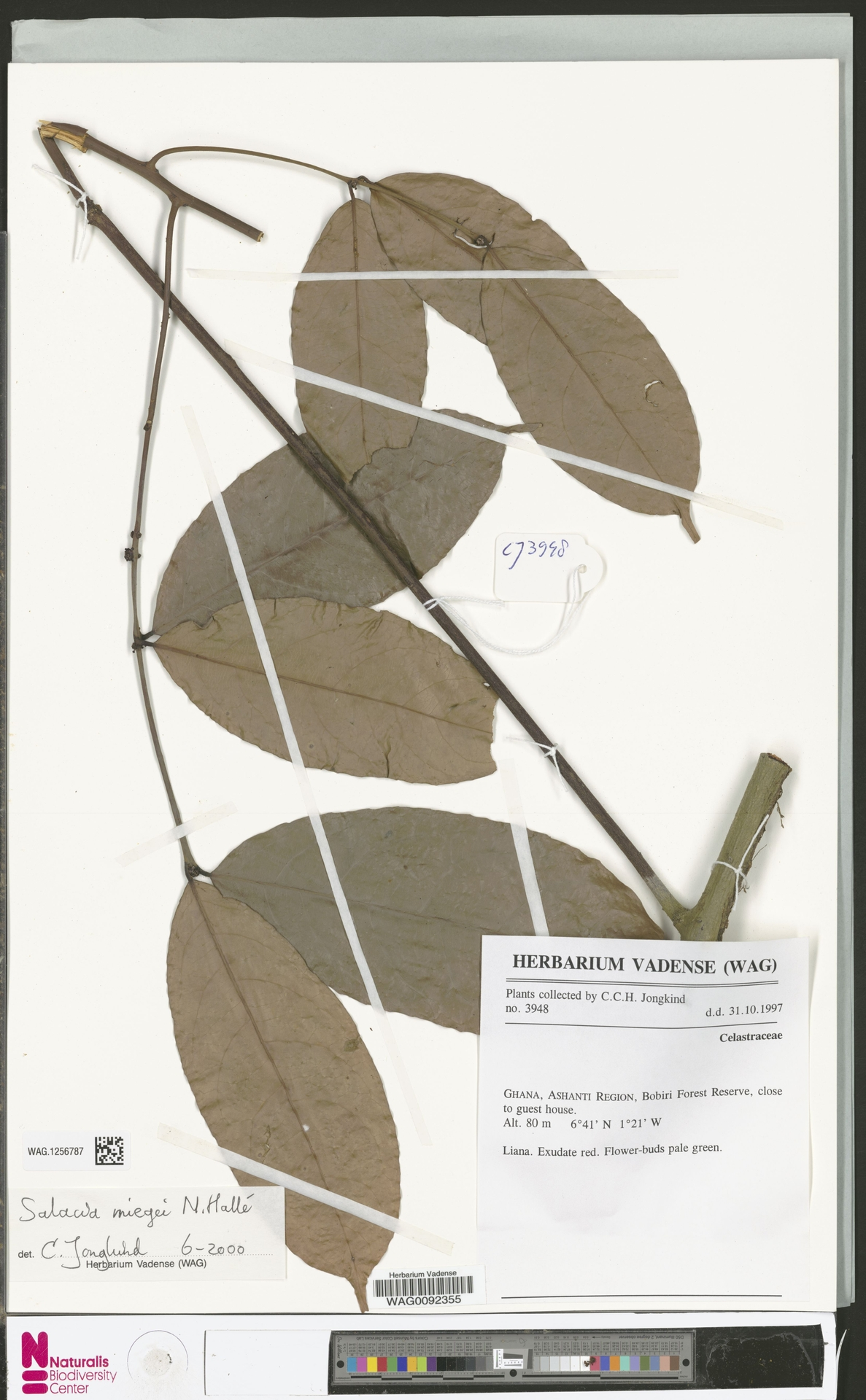

Conservation status
- Vulnerable (IUCN 2.3)

Scientific classification
- Kingdom: Plantae
- Clade: Tracheophytes
- Clade: Angiosperms
- Clade: Eudicots
- Clade: Rosids
- Order: Celastrales
- Family: Celastraceae
- Genus: Salacia
- Species: S. miegei

Binomial name
- Salacia miegei N.Hallé

= Salacia miegei =

Species of plant

Salacia miegei is a species of plant in the family Celastraceae. It is endemic to Côte d'Ivoire, where it grows in Western Guinean lowland forests, including Taï National Park, a protected area of primary rainforest and high endemism. It is threatened by habitat loss.
