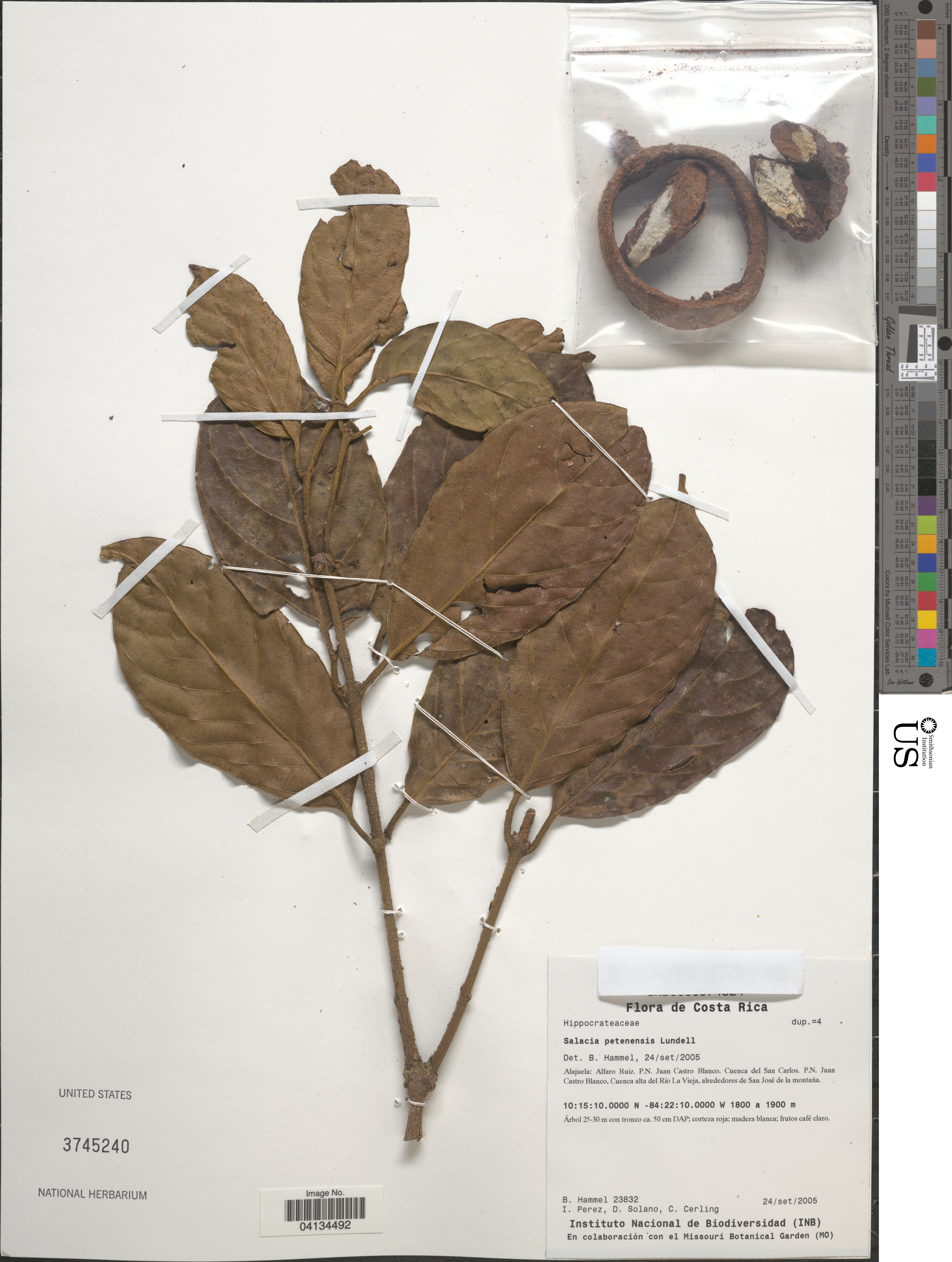

Conservation status
- Least Concern (IUCN 3.1)

Scientific classification
- Kingdom: Plantae
- Clade: Tracheophytes
- Clade: Angiosperms
- Clade: Eudicots
- Clade: Rosids
- Order: Celastrales
- Family: Celastraceae
- Genus: Salacia
- Species: S. petenensis

Binomial name
- Salacia petenensis Lundell

Synonyms
- Salacia cordata subsp. petenensis (Lundell) Lombardi

= Salacia petenensis =

Species of tree

Salacia petenensis is a species of flowering plant in the family Celastraceae. This tropical tree is native to Colombia, Costa Rica, Guatemala, southwest Mexico, Panama, and Venezuela. It is found in cloud forests at elevations of 1500 to 1700 m. It flowers from March through May and also in October and November. The flowers are tiny and have an odor like rotten fruit.
