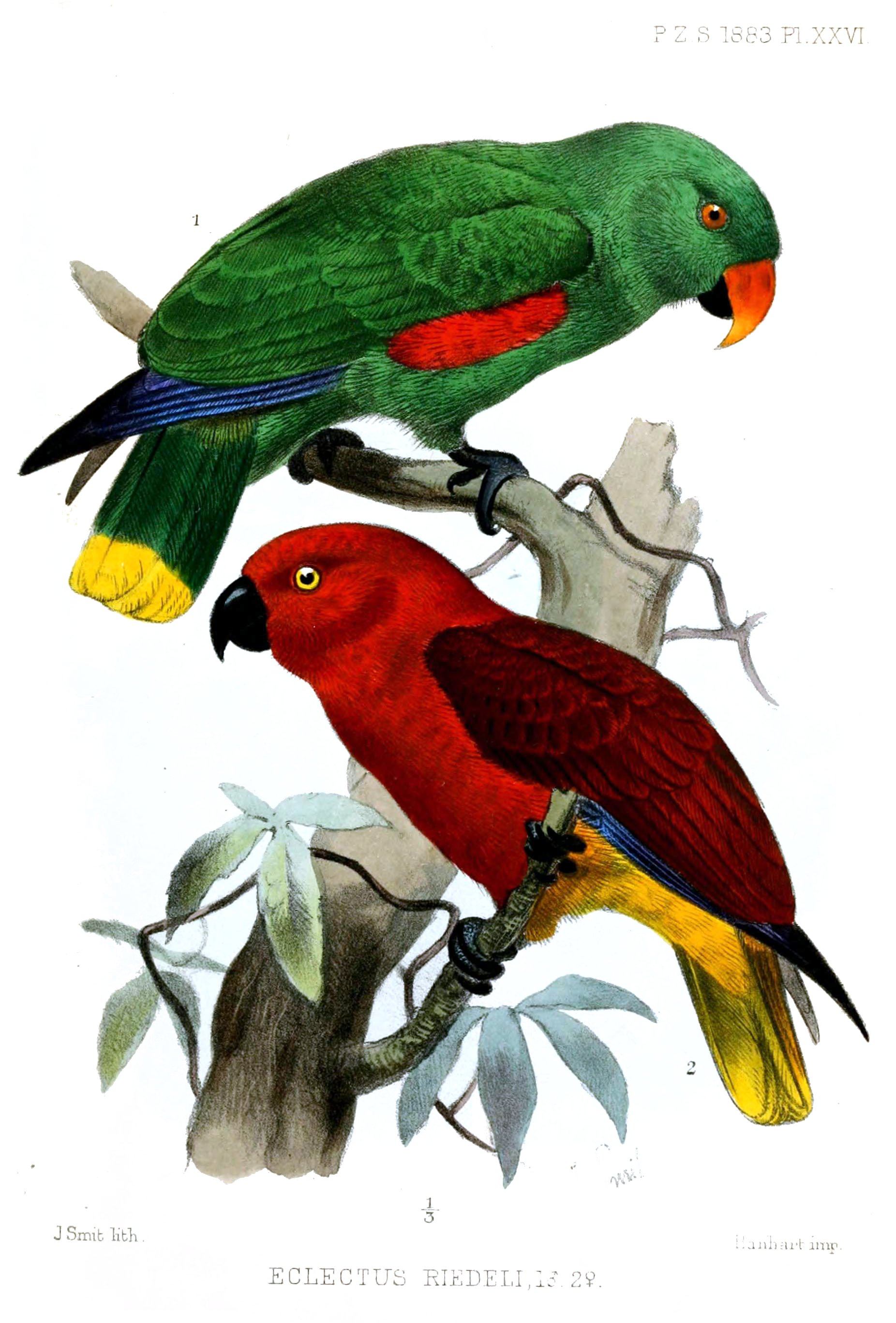
- 1883 illustration by Joseph Smit

Conservation status
- Vulnerable (IUCN 3.1)

Scientific classification
- Kingdom: Animalia
- Phylum: Chordata
- Class: Aves
- Order: Psittaciformes
- Family: Psittaculidae
- Genus: Eclectus
- Species: E. riedeli

Binomial name
- Eclectus riedeli Meyer, AB, 1882

= Tanimbar eclectus =

Species of parrot

The Tanimbar eclectus, or Riedel's eclectus (Eclectus riedeli) is a parrot species which is native to the Tanimbar Islands. It is smaller than the Moluccan eclectus. The male has a more bluish tinge to its green cheeks and neck, and its tail is edged with a broad band of yellow. The female has an all red plumage, except for royal blue primaries, yellow under-tail coverts and a broad band of yellow to edge the tail.

== Aviculture ==
Rare in captivity, the Tanimbar eclectus can be found in zoos and bird parks in Spain and Germany.
