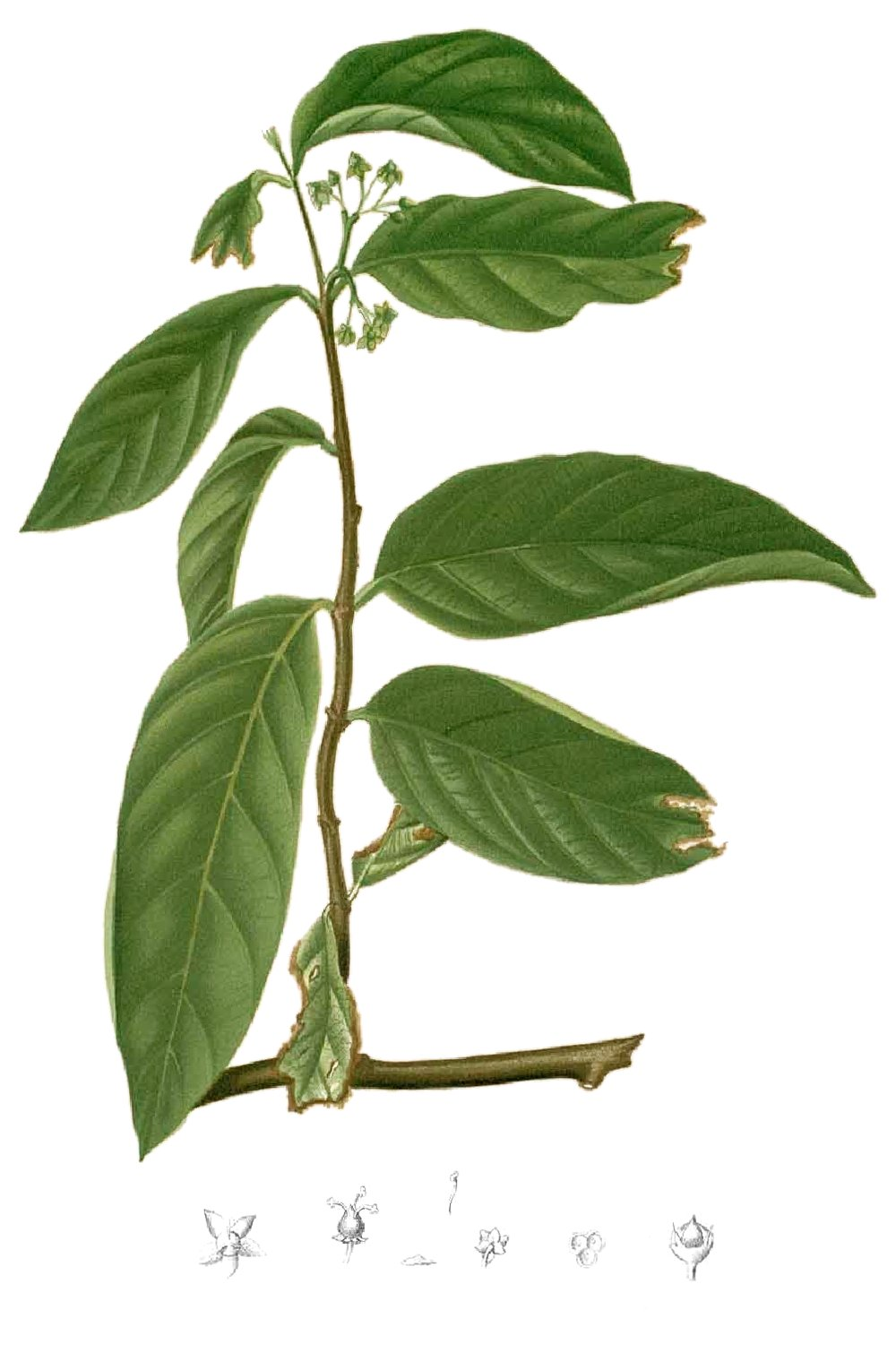

Scientific classification
- Kingdom: Plantae
- Clade: Tracheophytes
- Clade: Angiosperms
- Clade: Eudicots
- Clade: Rosids
- Order: Celastrales
- Family: Celastraceae
- Genus: Salacia
- Species: S. chinensis

Binomial name
- Salacia chinensis L.

Synonyms
- Click to expand: Tontelea prinoides Willd.; Tonsella chinensis (L.) Spreng.; Salacia wightiana Wall.; Salacia socia Craib; Salacia sinensis Blanco; Salacia roxburghii Wall.; Salacia prinoides (Willd.) DC.; Salacia podopetala Turcz.; Salacia patens Decne. ex Steud.; Salacia patens Decne.; Salacia naumannii Engl.; Salacia littoralis Backer; Salacia evonymiflora Zipp. ex Miq. Ann.; Salacia coromandeliana Teijsm. & Binn.; Salacia angularis Elmer ex Merrill; Johnia serrata Buch.-Ham.; Johnia salacioides Roxb.; Johnia coromandeliana Roxb.; Hippocratea prinoides DC. ex Ridl.; Comocladia serrata Blanco

= Salacia chinensis =

Species of shrub

Salacia chinensis is a species of plant in the family Celastraceae. A climbing shrub, it is also known as Chinese salacia, lolly berry, and saptachakra in Ayurveda. The plant is found widespread in South-East Asia and Australoceania.

== Description ==
Leaves are elliptic, narrowly ovate-round or obovate-elliptic 4.2-10.5 cm long and 2.2-4.0 cm wide, and glabrous; the petioles are 5–8 mm long. The fruit has one seed in it, the seed is only 8 mm long. Flowers have five petals and they are yellow or yellowish-green.
