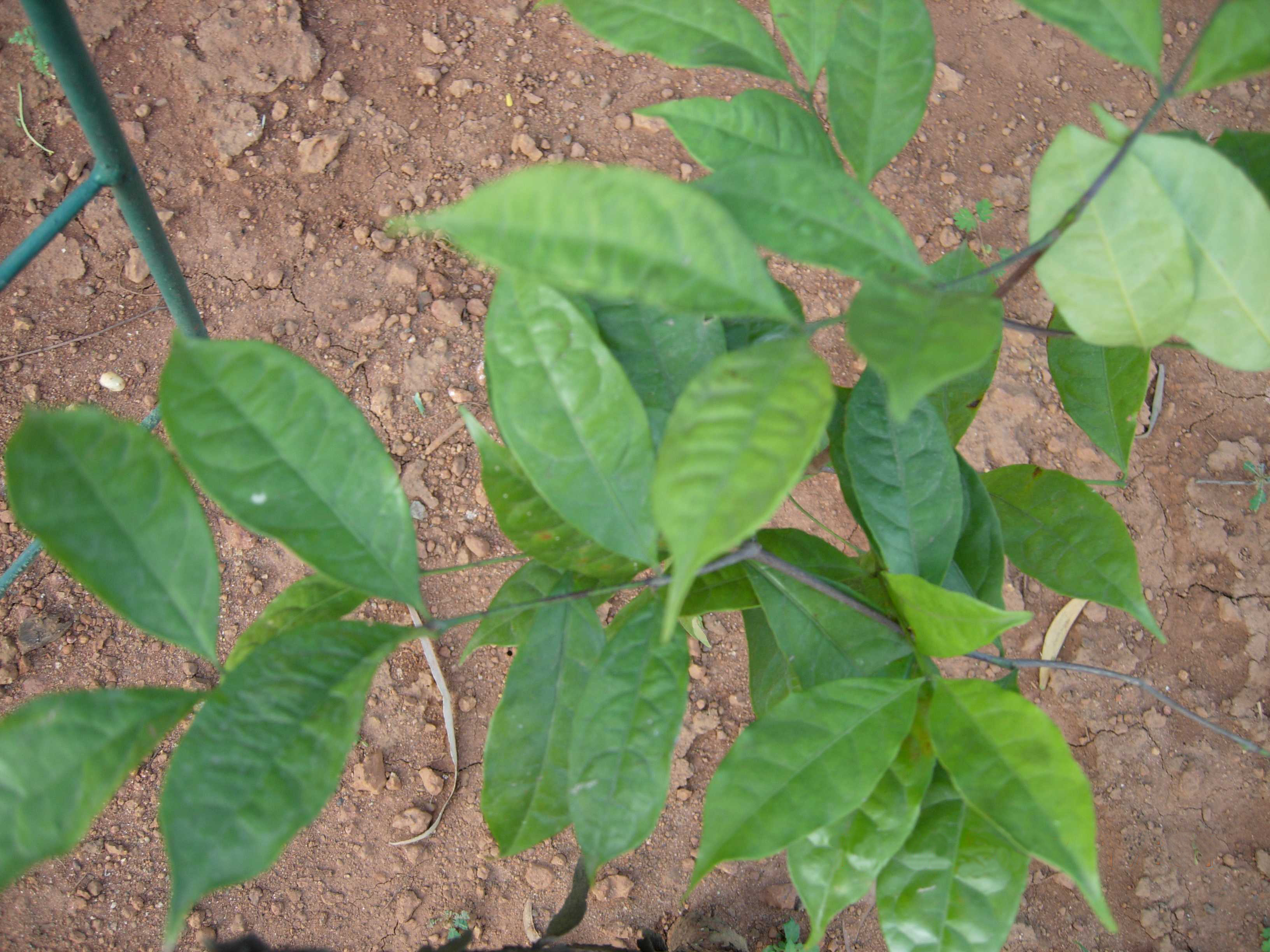

Scientific classification
- Kingdom: Plantae
- Clade: Tracheophytes
- Clade: Angiosperms
- Clade: Eudicots
- Clade: Rosids
- Order: Celastrales
- Family: Celastraceae
- Genus: Salacia
- Species: S. reticulata

Binomial name
- Salacia reticulata Wight

= Salacia reticulata =

Species of flowering plant

Salacia reticulata is a flowering plant of the genus Salacia native to Sri Lanka, the Andaman Islands, and India. As a liana, it grows and climbs among branches in wet tropical forests.

In some countries, S. reticulata extracts are used in foods or as dietary supplements in the unproven belief they may be therapies for diabetes or obesity. Although its extracts are used in Indian traditional medicine with the intent to treat diabetes, obesity or other diseases, there is no good clinical evidence that such extracts are effective or safe as a therapy for any disease.

== Description ==
Salacia reticulata is a climbing, perennial, woody shrub – a liana – with a dichotomous branching pattern. The bark is smooth, greenish grey in colour, thin, and white internally. The leaves are opposite and elliptic-oblong. The leaves have acute bases, abruptly acuminate apexes, and a margin with minute rounded teeth. The greenish-white flowers are bisexual and arranged in clusters of 2-6 in the leaf axils.

The orange-red ripe fruit is a drupe which is globose and tubercular. The fruit contains 1–4 seeds, each resembling an almond.

== Traditional medicine and research ==
S. reticulata extracts contain diverse polyphenols and stilbenoids.

Although commonly used in Indian traditional medicine under an assumption the plant can be used to treat diabetes and obesity, the root, stem, and leaf extracts of S. reticulata are only under basic research, and have not been evaluated in rigorous clinical trials to provide sufficient evidence of efficacy or safety.

S. reticulata extracts are neither approved as a medicine in any country nor are they included among internationally standard treatments for diabetes and obesity.
