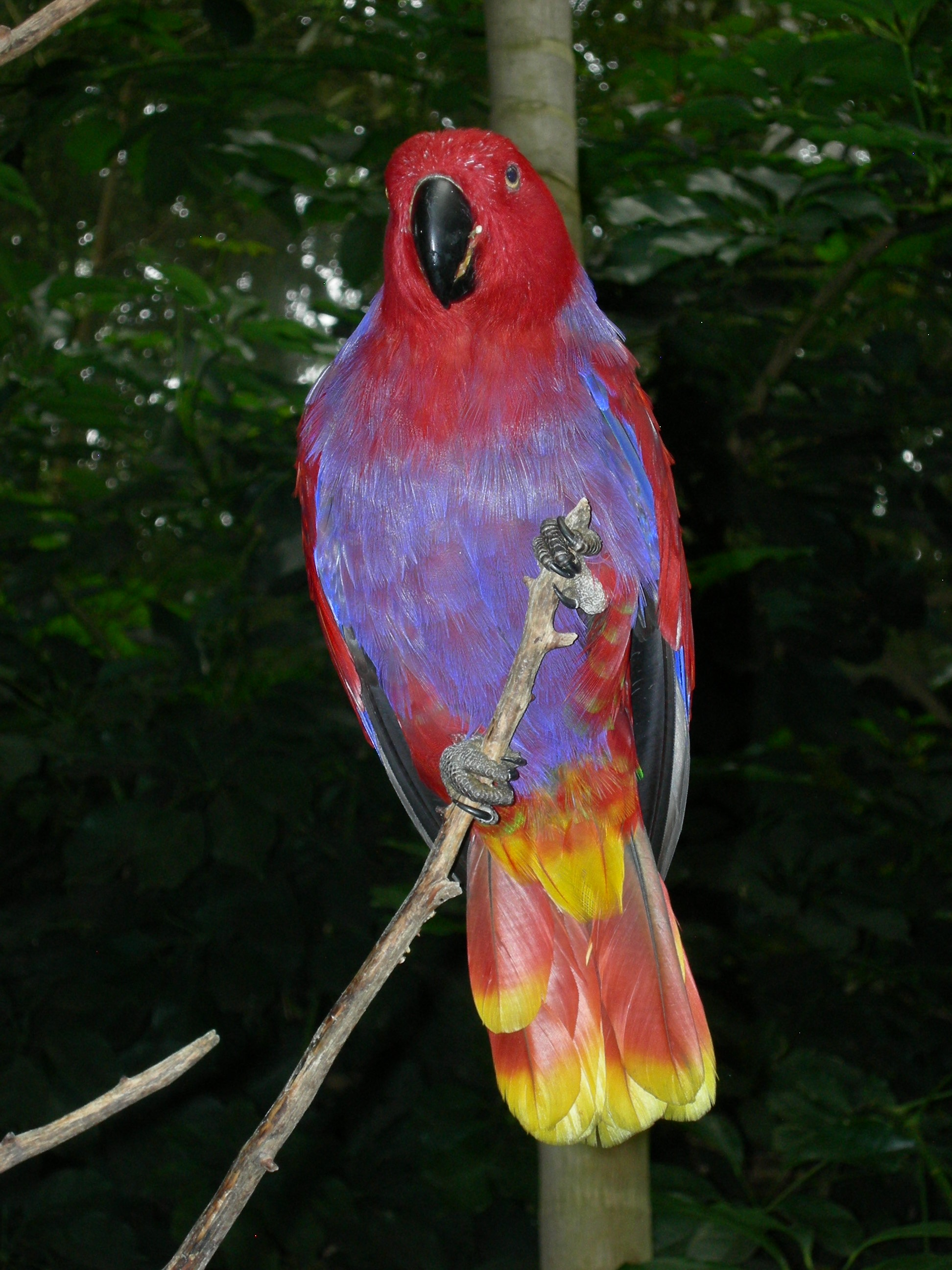
- Female E. r. vosmaeri at North Carolina Zoo
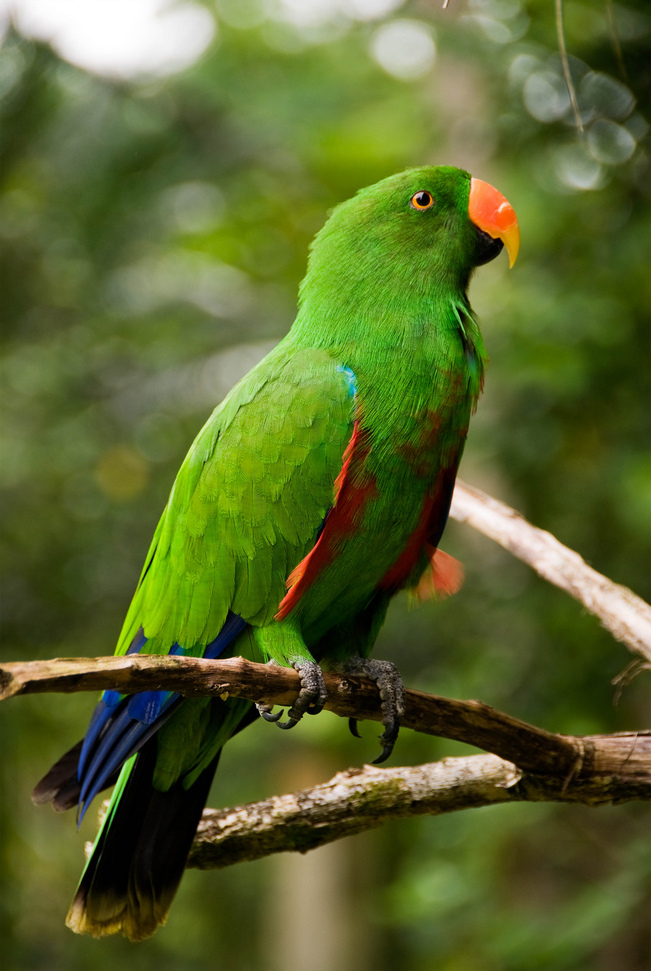
- Male at Malagos Garden Resort

Conservation status
- Least Concern (IUCN 3.1)

Scientific classification
- Kingdom: Animalia
- Phylum: Chordata
- Class: Aves
- Order: Psittaciformes
- Family: Psittaculidae
- Genus: Eclectus
- Species: E. roratus

Binomial name
- Eclectus roratus (Müller, 1776)

= Moluccan eclectus =

Species of bird

The Moluccan eclectus (Eclectus roratus) is a parrot native to the Maluku Islands (Moluccas). It is unusual in the parrot order for its extreme sexual dimorphism of the colours of the plumage; the male having a mostly bright emerald green plumage and the female a mostly bright red and purple/blue plumage. Joseph Forshaw, in his book Parrots of the World, noted that the first European ornithologists to see eclectus parrots thought they were of two distinct species. Large populations of this parrot remain, and they are sometimes considered pests for eating fruit off trees. Some populations restricted to relatively small islands are comparably rare. Their bright feathers are also used by native tribespeople in New Guinea as decorations.

== Taxonomy ==
Ornithologists usually classify the Moluccan eclectus as a member of tribe Psittaculini in the family Psittacidae of order Psittaciformes. However, some recent thoughts indicate a great deal of commonality between the eclectus parrots and the Lorini tribe.

Sir D'Arcy Wentworth Thompson noted similarities in the skull were noted between the eclectus parrots and members of the genus Geoffroyus, specifically in the auditory meatus and the prefrontal reaching but not joining the squamosal bones. The skull of members the genus Tanygnathus is also generally similar.

=== Subspecies ===
Male E. r. westermani, stuffed.

Three subspecies of Moluccan eclectus are known, although the species as a whole needs reviewing. Access to some regions where the species occurs is difficult due to geographical or political reasons, hence field observations have been limited. Furthermore, many skins collected in the early part of the 19th century have deteriorated in some museums. However, most eclectus skins in US museums are in good condition. In captivity in the U.S., some of the most common subspecies are Vosmaer's, and the New Guinea red-sided.

- E. r. roratus, known as the grand eclectus, is found on Buru, Seram, Ambon, Saparua, and Haruku in the southern Maluku Islands. The subspecies begins intergrading with race vosmaeri on Seram.
- E. r. vosmaeri, known as Vosmaer's eclectus or Vos eclectus, was originally described by Rothschild and is named after Dutch naturalist Arnout Vosmaer, who described the bird in his writings in 1769, noting it as new to science, based upon a female individual discovered in his collection. Larger in size than the nominate subspecies with more yellow in the plumage, it is found on islands in the North Maluku province. The male has more yellow-toned plumage on the head and neck. The tail is bluer and has a small pale lemon yellow border. The female is a brighter red on the head, back, and wings. Her undertail coverts are yellow and at least an inch of the tail is bright pure yellow. Vosmaer's eclectus is the most commonly kept subspecies in aviculture.
- E. r. westermani, known as Westerman's eclectus – many of the museum specimens have clipped wings and clipped tails, and no uniformity is seen in the coloration of the female specimens, indicating the likelihood of these specimens being crossbred aviary birds. However, Joseph Forshaw doubted it was an aberration, and its status remains unclear. If it ever existed, it is extinct today.

== Description ==
The Moluccan eclectus is unusual in the parrot family for its marked visible light sexual dimorphism in the colours of the plumage. A stocky short-tailed parrot, it measures around 35 cm (14 in) in length. The male is mostly bright green with a yellow-tinge on the head. It has blue primaries, and red flanks and underwing coverts. Its tail is edged with a narrow band of creamy yellow and is dark grey edged with creamy yellow underneath, and the tail feathers are green centrally and bluer as they get towards the edges. The grand Eclectus female is mostly bright red with a darker hue on the back and wings. The mantle and underwing coverts darken to a more purple in colour, and the wing is edged with a mauve-blue. The tail is edged with yellowish-orange above and is more orange tipped with yellow underneath. The upper mandible of the adult male is orange at the base fading to a yellow towards the tip, and the lower mandible is black. The beak of the adult female is all black. Adults have yellow to orange irises and juveniles have dark brown to black irises. The upper mandible of both male and female juveniles are brown at the base fading to yellow towards the biting edges and the tip. The abdomen and nape of the females are blue in most subspecies, purple abdomen and nape in the subspecies (roratus) and lavender abdomen and nape in the (vosmaeri). Females of riedeli and vosmaeri also have yellow undertail coverts. The female vosmaeri displays the brightest red of all the subspecies, both on the head and body. They don't tend to talk in clear voices until they are 1 year old.

A blue colour mutation has appeared in avicultural eclectus populations as a result of a recessive gene. The cock bird is light blue, while the hen is a combination of dark blue, white and grey.

== Diet ==
The diet of the Moluccan eclectus in the wild consists of mainly fruits, wild figs, unripe nuts, flower and leaf buds, and some seeds. In captivity, they should eat a lower sugar diet for their health as they are not flying the same mileage as a wild bird, even though they crave most fruits including mangos, figs, guavas, bananas, melons, stone fruits, grapes, citrus fruits, pears, apples, pomegranate, and papaya. The eclectus has an unusually long digestive tract, so tolerates a high-fiber diet. In captivity, the Moluccan eclectus benefits from specially formulated pellets or bird biscuit diet, backed up with daily serves of 2 to 3 fruits, and 5 vegetables (& leafy greens such as endive and dandelion), and a small amount of seeds and nuts such as almonds and walnuts to be used as treats. Keeping seed and nuts to be fed by hand as treats restricts over intake of oils, which can happen if these are just put into feed bowls.

== Breeding ==
In its natural habitat, the Moluccan eclectus nests within hollows in large, emergent rainforest trees. Suitable hollows are at a premium and the hen vigorously defends her chosen nesting site from other females (perhaps even fighting to the death), remaining resident at 'her tree' for up to 11 months of the year, rarely straying from the entrance to her hollow and relying on multiple males to feed her via regurgitation. Males may travel up to 20 km to forage and up to five males will regularly provide food for each female, each competing with the others for her affections and the right to father her young. Unlike other parrot species, eclectus parrots are polygynandrous—females may mate with multiple male suitors and males may travel from nesting site to nesting site to mate with multiple females. This unique breeding strategy may explain the pronounced sexual dimorphism of the eclectus, as the female must remain conspicuous at the entry to the nest hole (to advertise her presence at her hollow to males and rival females), but well hidden when in the depths of the nest, because the red color hides her well in the darkness. The male is primarily a brilliant green color, which offers camouflage amongst the trees whilst foraging. However, the plumage of both sexes appears spectacular when viewed in the ultraviolet spectrum, an ability which predators such as hawks and owls lack.

Two white 40.0 mm × 31.0 mm (1.57 in × 1.22 in) eggs are laid, which are incubated for 28–30 days. Young fledge at about 11 weeks. Although eclectus parrots may reach sexual maturity earlier or later, they usually reach it between 2–3 years.

Moluccan eclectus hens have a strong maternal instinct, which is displayed in captivity, where they constantly seek possible nesting places, climbing into cupboards, drawers, and spaces beneath furniture, and becoming very possessive and defensive of these locations. An unpaired hen may go on to lay infertile eggs with little encouragement in the spring. It is often possible to place abandoned eggs from other parrot species beneath a broody eclectus hen, which she will readily accept and then incubate to the point of hatching, even rearing the hatched chick up to the point it is removed from the nest.

Adult females with poor nest hollows often commit infanticide on the male, if they produce both a male and a female chick. Inadequate nest hollows have a habit of flooding in heavy rain, drowning the chicks or eggs inside. This reported infanticide in wild pairs may be the result of other causes, since this behavior where the hen selectively kills male chicks is not observed in captive birds.

== Aviculture ==
Moluccan eclectus parrots are one of the more popular birds kept in captivity, as either parent or hand reared. Unlike many other species of parrot they are relatively easy to breed yet difficult to hand feed.

Moluccan eclectus are generally calm birds in captivity, displaying a pensive affect when faced with novel items or situations, which may give rise to the mistaken impression that the species is 'dull-witted'. The eclectus may also exhibit more neophobia than other species of companion bird. Eclectus parrots are prone to feather destruction (picking, pulling, cutting, and / or barbing) in captivity.

The subspecies E. r. vosmaeri is the most commonly kept in aviculture over all.

The average lifespan of the Moluccan eclectus in captivity is unknown, since these birds were not kept in captivity in great numbers until the 1980s. Some sources consider the lifespan to be 30 years. The maximum reliably recorded longevity for this species is 28.5 years, but a lifespan of 40.8 years has also been reported.

Moluccan eclectus in captivity are prone to "toe tapping" – characterized by involuntary extension and contractions of the muscles of the feet that cause the bird to constantly tap its toenails against a perch. It is believed to be related to bird's diet and may be a result of providing the eclectus with food fortified with vitamins, processed food intended for humans (particularly containing man-made vitamins or preservatives) or food containing spirulina.
